The history of the island of Taiwan dates back tens of thousands of years to the earliest known evidence of human habitation. The sudden appearance of a culture based on agriculture around 3000 BC is believed to reflect the arrival of the ancestors of today's Taiwanese indigenous peoples. From the late 13th to early 17th centuries, Han Chinese gradually came into contact with Taiwan and started settling there. Named Formosa by Portuguese explorers, the south of the island was colonized by the Dutch in the 17th century whilst the Spanish built a settlement in the north which lasted until 1642. These European settlements were followed by an influx of Hoklo and Hakka immigrants from Fujian and Guangdong across the Taiwan Strait.

In 1662, Koxinga, a loyalist of the Ming dynasty who had lost control of mainland China in 1644, defeated the Dutch and established a base of operations on the island. His descendants were defeated by the Qing dynasty in 1683 and their territory in Taiwan was annexed by the Qing dynasty. The Qing dynasty gradually extended its control over the western plains and northeast of Taiwan in the following two centuries. Under Qing rule, Taiwan's population became majority Han due to migration from mainland China. The Qing ceded Taiwan and Penghu to the Empire of Japan after losing the First Sino-Japanese War in 1895. Taiwan experienced industrial growth and became a productive rice and sugar exporting Japanese colony. During the Second Sino-Japanese War it served as a base for launching invasions of China, and later Southeast Asia and the Pacific during World War II. Japanese imperial education was implemented in Taiwan and many Taiwanese fought for Japan in the last years of the war.

In 1945, following the end hostilities in World War II, the nationalist government of the Republic of China (ROC), led by the Kuomintang (KMT), took control of Taiwan. The legality and nature of its control of Taiwan, including transfer of sovereignty is debated, with the United States and United Kingdom saying there was no transfer of sovereignty. In 1949, after losing control of mainland China in the Chinese Civil War, the ROC government under the KMT withdrew to Taiwan where Chiang Kai-shek declared martial law. The KMT ruled Taiwan (along with the islands of Kinmen, Wuqiu and the Matsu on the opposite side of the Taiwan Strait) as a single-party state for forty years until democratic reforms in the 1980s. The first-ever direct presidential election was held in 1996. During the post-war period, Taiwan experienced rapid industrialization and economic growth known as the "Taiwan Miracle", and was known as one of the "Four Asian Tigers".

Prehistory

In the Late Pleistocene, sea levels were about 140 m lower than in the present day, exposing the floor of the shallow Taiwan Strait as a land bridge that was crossed by mainland fauna. A concentration of vertebrate fossils has been found in the channel between the Penghu Islands and Taiwan, including a partial jawbone designated Penghu 1, apparently belonging to a previously unknown species of genus Homo.
These fossils are dated 450,000 to 190,000 years ago. The oldest evidence of modern human presence on Taiwan consists of three cranial fragments and a molar tooth found at Chouqu and Gangzilin, in Zuojhen District, Tainan. These are estimated to be between 20,000 and 30,000 years old. The oldest artefacts are chipped-pebble tools of the Paleolithic Changbin culture found in four caves in Changbin, Taitung, dated 15,000 to 5,000 years ago, and similar to contemporary sites in Fujian. The same culture is found at sites at Eluanbi on the southern tip of Taiwan, persisting until 5,000 years ago. Analysis of spores and pollen grains in sediment of Sun Moon Lake suggests that traces of slash-and-burn agriculture started in the area since 11,000 years ago, and ended 4,200 years ago, when abundant remains of rice cultivation were found in such period. At the beginning of the Holocene 10,000 years ago, sea levels rose, forming the Taiwan Strait and cutting off the island from the Asian mainland.

In December 2011, the ~8,000 year old Liangdao Man skeleton was found on Liang Island. In 2014, the mitochondrial DNA of the skeleton was found to belong to Haplogroup E, with two of the four mutations characteristic of the E1 subgroup.

The only Paleolithic burial that has been found on Taiwan was in Xiaoma cave in Chenggong in the southeast of the island, dating from about 4000 BC, of a male similar in type to Negritos found in the Philippines.
There are also references in Chinese texts and Taiwanese aboriginal oral traditions to pygmies on the island at some time in the past.

Around 3,000 BC, the Neolithic Dapenkeng culture abruptly appeared and quickly spread around the coast of the island. Their sites are characterised by corded-ware pottery, polished stone adzes and slate points. The inhabitants cultivated rice and millet, but were also heavily reliant on marine shells and fish. Most scholars believe this culture is not derived from the Changbin culture, but was brought across the Strait by the ancestors of today's Taiwanese aborigines, speaking early Austronesian languages. Some of these people later migrated from Taiwan to the islands of Southeast Asia and thence throughout the Pacific and Indian Oceans.
Malayo-Polynesian languages are now spoken across a huge area from Madagascar to Hawaii, Easter Island and New Zealand, but form only one branch of the Austronesian family, the rest of whose branches are found only on Taiwan.
Trade links with the Philippines continued from the early 2nd millennium BC, including the use of jade from eastern Taiwan in the Philippine jade culture.

The Dapenkeng culture was succeeded by a variety of cultures throughout the island, including the Tahu and Yingpu cultures.
Iron appeared at the beginning of the current era in such cultures as the Niaosung Culture.
The earliest metal artifacts were trade goods, but by around 400 AD wrought iron was being produced locally using bloomeries, a technology possibly introduced from the Philippines.

Chinese contact and settlement
Early Chinese histories refer to visits to eastern islands that some historians identify with Taiwan. Troops of the Three Kingdoms state of Eastern Wu are recorded visiting an island known as Yizhou in the spring of 230. They brought back several thousand natives but 80 to 90 percent of the soldiers died to unknown diseases. Some scholars have identified this island as Taiwan while others do not. The Book of Sui relates that Emperor Yang of the Sui dynasty sent three expeditions to a place called "Liuqiu" early in the 7th century. They brought back captives, cloth, and armour. The Liuqiu described by the Book of Sui had pigs and chicken but no cows, sheep, donkeys, or horses. It produced little iron, had no writing system, taxation, or penal code, and was ruled by a king with four or five commanders. The natives used stone blades and practiced slash-and-burn agriculture to grow rice, millet, sorghum, and beans. Later the name Liuqiu (whose characters are read in Japanese as "Ryukyu") referred to the island chain to the northeast of Taiwan, but some scholars believe it may have referred to Taiwan in the Sui period. Okinawa Island was referred to by the Chinese as "Great Liuqiu" and Taiwan as "Lesser Liuqiu".

During the Yuan dynasty (1271–1368), Han Chinese people started visiting Taiwan. The Yuan emperor Kublai Khan sent officials to the Ryukyu Kingdom in 1292 to demand its loyalty to the Yuan dynasty, but the officials ended up in Taiwan and mistook it for Ryukyu. After three soldiers were killed, the delegation immediately retreated to Quanzhou in China. Another expedition was sent in 1297. Wang Dayuan visited Taiwan in 1349 and noted that he did not find any Chinese there and the people were different from Penghu's population. He mentioned the presence of Chuhou pottery from present day Lishui, Zhejiang, suggesting that Chinese merchants had already visited the island by the 1340s.

By the early 16th century, increasing numbers of Chinese fishermen, traders and pirates were visiting the southwestern part of the island. Some merchants from Fujian were familiar enough with the indigenous peoples of Taiwan to speak Formosan languages. The people of Fujian sailed closer to Taiwan and the Ryukyus in the mid-16th century to trade with Japan while evading Ming authorities. Chinese who traded in Southeast Asia also began taking an East Sea Compass Course (dongyang zhenlu) that passed southwestern and southern Taiwan. Some of them traded with the Taiwanese aborigines. During this period, Taiwan was referred to as Xiaodong dao ("little eastern island") and Dahui guo ("the country of Dahui"), a corruption of Tayouan, a tribe that lived on an islet near modern Tainan from which the name "Taiwan" is derived. By the late 16th century, Chinese from Fujian were settling in southwestern Taiwan. The Chinese pirates Lin Daoqian and Lin Feng visited Taiwan in 1563 and 1574 respectively. Lin Daoqian was a pirate from Chaozhou who fled to Beigang in southwestern Taiwan and left shortly after. Lin Feng moved his pirate forces to Wankan (in modern Chiayi County) in Taiwan on 3 November 1574 and used it as a base to launch raids. They left for Penghu after being attacked by natives and the Ming navy dislodged them from their bases. He later returned to Wankan on 27 December 1575 but left for Southeast Asia after losing a naval encounter with Ming forces on 15 January 1576. The pirate Yan Siqi also used Taiwan as a base. In 1593, Ming officials started issuing ten licenses each year for Chinese junks to trade in northern Taiwan. Chinese records show that after 1593, each year five licenses were granted for trade in Keelung and five licenses for Tamsui. However these licenses merely acknowledged already existing illegal trade at these locations.

Initially Chinese merchants arrived in northern Taiwan and sold iron and textiles to the aboriginal peoples in return for coal, sulfur, gold, and venison. Later the southwestern part of Taiwan surpassed northern Taiwan as the destination for Chinese traders. The southwest had mullet fish, which drew more than a hundred fishing junks from Fujian each year during winter. The fishing season lasted six to eight weeks. Some of them camped on Taiwan's shores and many began trading with the indigenous people for deer products. The southwestern Taiwanese trade was of minor importance until after 1567 when it was used as a way to circumvent the ban on Sino-Japanese trade. The Chinese bought deerskins from the aborigines and sold them to the Japanese for a large profit.

When a Portuguese ship sailed past southwestern Taiwan in 1596, several of its crew members who had been shipwrecked there in 1582 noticed that the land had become cultivated and now had people working it, presumably by settlers from Fujian. When the Dutch arrived in 1623, they found about 1,500 Chinese visitors and residents. Most of them were engaged in seasonal fishing, hunting, and trading. The population fluctuated throughout the year peaking during winter. A small minority brought Chinese plants with them and grew crops such as apples, oranges, bananas, watermelons. Some estimates of the Chinese population put it at 2,000. There were two Chinese villages. The larger one was located on an island that formed the Bay of Tayouan. It was inhabited year-round. The smaller village was located on the mainland and would eventually become the city of Tainan. In the early 17th century, a Chinese man described it as being inhabited by pirates and fishermen. One Dutch visitor noted that an aboriginal village near the Sino-Japanese trade center had a large number of Chinese and there was "scarcely a house in this village . . . that does not have one or two or three, or even five or six Chinese living there." The villagers' speech contained many Chinese words and sounded like "a mixed and broken language."

Chinese descriptions of Taiwan

Wang Dayuan
In 1349, Wang Dayuan provided the first written account of a visit to Taiwan. He found no Chinese settlers there but many on Penghu.

Wang called different regions of Taiwan Liuqiu and Pisheye. According to Wang, Liuqiu was a vast land of huge trees and mountains named Cuilu, Zhongman, Futou, and Dazhi. A mountain could be seen from Penghu. He climbed the mountain and could see the coasts. Wang described a rich land with fertile fields that was hotter than Penghu. Its people had different customs from Penghu. They did not have boats and oars but only rafts. The men and women bound their hair and wore colored garments. They obtained salt from boiled sea water and liquor from fermented sugarcane juice. There were barbarian lords and chiefs that were respected by the people and they had a bone-and-flesh relationship between father and son. They practiced cannibalism against their enemies. The land's products included gold, beans, millet, sulphur, beeswax, deer hide, leopards, and moose. They accepted pearls, agates, gold, beads, dishware, and pottery as items of trade.

According to Wang, Pisheye was located to the east. It had extensive mountains and plains but the people did not engage in much agriculture or produce any products. The weather was hotter than Liuqiu. Its people wore their hair in tufts, tattooed their bodies with black juice, and wrapped red silk and yellow cloth around their heads. Pisheye had no chief. Its people hid in wild mountains and solitary valleys. They practiced raiding and plundering by boat. Kidnapping and slave trading were common. The historian Efren B. Isorena, through analysis of historical accounts and wind currents in the Pacific side of East and Southeast Asia, concluded that the Pisheye of Taiwan and the Bisaya of the Visayas islands in the Philippines, were closely related people as Visayans were recorded to have travelled to Taiwan from the Philippines via the northward windcurrents before they raided China and returned south after the southwards monsoon during summer.

Chen Di

In the winter of 1602–1603, Chen Di visited Taiwan on an expedition against the Wokou pirates. General Shen of Wuyu  defeated the wokou and met with the chieftain Damila, who presented gifts of deer and liquor as thanks for getting rid of the pirates. Chen witnessed these events and wrote an account of Taiwan known as Dongfanji (An Account of the Eastern Barbarians).

According to Chen, the Eastern Barbarians lived on an island beyond Penghu. They lived in Wanggang, Jialaowan, Dayuan (variation of Taiwan), Yaogang, Dagouyu, Xiao Danshui, Shuangqikou, Jialilin, Shabali, and Dabangkeng. Their land extended several thousand li covering villages where people lived separately in groups of five hundred to a thousand people. They had no chief but the one with the most children, who was considered a hero and obeyed by the populace. The people liked to fight and run in their free time so that the soles of their feet were very thick, able to tread on thorny brushes. They ran as fast as a horse. Chen figured they could cover several hundred li in a day. During quarrels between villages, they sent warriors to kill each other on an agreed upon date, but the conflicts ended without any enmity between them. They practiced headhunting. Thieves were killed at the village altar.

The land was warm to the point that people wore no clothes during winter. Women wore plait grass skirts that only covered their lower body. The men cut their hair while the women did not. The men pierced their ears while the women decorated their teeth. Chen considered the women to be sturdy and active, working constantly, while the men usually idled. They did not bow or kneel. They had no knowledge of a calendar or writing and understood a full moon cycle as a month with a year being ten months. They eventually forgot the count and lost track of their own age.

Their houses were made with thatch and bamboo, which grew tall and thick in abundance. Tribes had a common-house where all the unmarried boys lived. Matters of deliberation were discussed at the common-house. When a boy saw a girl he wished to marry, he sent her a pair of agate beads. If the girl accepted them, the boy went to her house at night and played an instrument called the kouqin. Upon acknowledgement by the girl, the boy stayed the night. When a child was born, she went to the man's home to fetch him back as a son-in-law and he would live with her family supporting them for the rest of their lives. Girls were preferred because of this. Men could remarry upon their wives' death but not women. Corpses were dried and buried beneath their families' houses when they needed to be rebuilt.

They did not have irrigated fields and cleared areas by fire before planting their crop. Once the mountain flowers bloomed they plowed their fields and once the grain ripened they were plucked. Their grains included soya bean, lentil, sesame, pearl-barley, but no wheat. For vegetables they had onions, ginger, sweet potatoes, and taro. For fruits they had coconuts, persimmons, citron and sugarcane. Rice grains were longer and tastier than the grains Chen was accustomed to. They gathered herbs and mixed them with fermented rice to make liquor. During banquets they drank the liquor by pouring it into a bamboo tube. No food was served during these occasions. They danced and sang songs to music. For domesticated animals they had cats, dogs, pigs, and chicken, but not horses, donkeys, cattle, sheep, geese, or deer. There were wild tigers, bears, leopards, and deer. Deer inhabited the mountains and moved in herds of a hundred or a thousand. Men hunted deer using spears made of bamboo shafts and iron points. They also hunted tigers. Deer hunts only occurred in the winter when they came out in herds. They ate deer meat and pig meat but not chicken.

Although they lived on an island they did not have boats and feared the sea. They only fished in small streams. They had no contact with any of the non-Chinese peoples outside Taiwan. During the Yongle period (1403-1424), Zheng He carried an Imperial Edict to the Eastern Barbarians, but the indigenous people of Taiwan remained hidden and would not be coerced. Their families were given brass bells to hang around their necks to symbolize their status as dogs, but they kept the bells and handed them down as treasures. During the 1560s the wokou attacked the indigenous people of Taiwan with firearms, forcing them into the mountains. Afterwards they came into contact with China. Chinese from the harbors of Huimin, Chonglong, and Lieyu in Zhangzhou and Quanzhou learned their languages to trade with them. The Chinese traded things like agate beads, porcelain, cloth, salt, and brass in return for deer meat, skins, and horns. They obtained Chinese clothing that they only put on while dealing with the Chinese and took them off for storage afterwards. Chen saw their way of life, without hat or shoe, going about naked, to be easy and simple.

Dutch and Spanish colonies (1624–1668)

Contact and establishment

Portuguese sailors, passing Taiwan in 1544, first jotted in a ship's log the name of the island Ilha Formosa, meaning "Beautiful Island". In 1582, the survivors of a Portuguese shipwreck spent 45 days battling malaria and aborigines before returning to Macau on a raft. When they returned to Taiwan's southwestern coast in 1596, some of the crew members who had been shipwrecked in 1582 noticed that the land had been cultivated and now had people working it, presumably by settlers from Fujian.

The Dutch East India Company (VOC) came to the area in search of an Asian trade and military base. Defeated by the Portuguese at the Battle of Macau in 1622, they attempted to occupy Penghu, but were driven off by the Ming authorities in 1624. They then built Fort Zeelandia on the islet of Tayowan off the southwest coast of Taiwan. The site is now part of the main island, in modern Anping, Tainan. On the adjacent mainland, they built a smaller brick fort, Fort Provintia. Local aboriginals called the area Pakan and on some old maps the island of Taiwan is named Pakan.

Piracy
The Europeans worked with and also fought against Chinese pirates. The pirate Li Dan was the mediator between Ming Chinese forces and the Dutch at Penghu. In 1625, VOC officials learned that he had kept gifts they had entrusted him with giving to Chinese officials. His men also tried pillaging junks on their way to trade in Taiwan. One Salvador Diaz acted as the pirates' informant and gave them inside information on where junks leaving Tayouan could be captured. Diaz collected protection money as well. A Chinese merchant named Xu Xinsu complained to Dutch officials that he was forced to pay 2,000 taels to Diaz. Li Dan's son, Li Guozhu, also collected collection money, known as "water taxes". Chinese fishermen paid 10 percent of their catch for a document guaranteeing their safety from pirates. This caused the VOC to also enter the protection business. They sent three junks to patrol a fishing fleet charging the same fee as the pirates, 10 percent of the catch. This was one of the first taxes the company levied on the colony.

In July 1626, the Council of Formosa ordered all Chinese living or trading in Taiwan to obtain a license to "distinguish the pirates from the traders and workers". This residence permit eventually became a head tax and major source of income for the Dutch.

Zheng Zhilong
After Li Dan died in 1625, Zheng Zhilong became the new pirate chief. The Dutch allowed him to pillage under their flag. In 1626, he sold a large junk to the company, and on another occasion he delivered nine captured junks as well as their cargos worth more than 20,000 taels. Chinese officials asked the Dutch for help against Zheng in return for trading rights. The company agreed and the Dutch lieutenant governor visited the officials in Fujian to inform them that the Dutch would drive Zheng from the coast. The Dutch failed and Zheng attacked the city of Xiamen, destroying hundreds of junks and setting fire to buildings and houses. In response, in 1628, the Chinese authorities awarded him with an official title and imperial rank. Zheng became the "Patrolling Admiral" responsible for clearing the coast of pirates. He used his official position to destroy his competitors and established himself in the port of Yuegang. In October 1628, Zheng agreed to supply silks, sugar, ginger, and other goods to the company in return for silver and spices at a fixed rate. Then the Dutch got angry at Zheng, who they were convinced was trying to monopolize trade to Taiwan. His promised "disappeared into smoke". In the summer of 1633, a Dutch fleet and the pirate Liu Xiang carried out a successful sneak attack on Zheng's fleet. Zheng believed that he and the Dutch were on good terms and was caught off guard; his fleet was destroyed.

Zheng immediately began preparing a new fleet. On 22 October 1633, the Zheng forces lured the Dutch fleet and their pirate allies into an ambush and defeated them. The Dutch reconciled with Zheng, who offered them favorable terms, and he arranged for more Chinese trade in Taiwan. The Dutch believed this was because of Chinese fears of piracy. The pirate Liu Xiang still fought against Zheng, and when the Dutch refused to help him, Liu captured a Dutch junk and used its 30-man crew as human shields. Liu attacked Fort Zeelandia but some Chinese residents warned the company and they fought off the pirates without any trouble. In 1637, Liu was defeated by Zheng, who established primacy over the Fujianese trading world. He continued to have a hand in the affairs of Taiwan and aided the growth of the Chinese population there. He made plans with a Chinese official to relocate drought victims to Taiwan and to provide each person three silver taels and an ox for every three people. The plan was never carried out.

Japanese trade

The Japanese had been trading for Chinese products in Taiwan since before the Dutch arrived in 1624. In 1593, Toyotomi Hideyoshi planned to incorporate Taiwan into his empire and sent an envoy with a letter demanding tribute. The letter was never delivered since there was no authority to receive it. In 1609, the Tokugawa shogunate sent Harunobu Arima on an exploratory mission of the island. In 1616, Nagasaki official Murayama Tōan sent 13 vessels to conquer Taiwan. The fleet was dispersed by a typhoon and the one junk that reached Taiwan was ambushed by headhunters, after which the expedition left and raided the Chinese coast instead.

In 1625, Batavia ordered the governor of Taiwan to prevent the Japanese from trading. The Chinese silk merchants refused to sell to the company because the Japanese paid more. The Dutch also restricted Japanese trade with the Ming dynasty. In response, the Japanese took on board 16 inhabitants from the aboriginal village of Sinkan and returned to Japan. Suetsugu Heizō Masanao housed the Sinkanders in Nagasaki. Batavia sent a man named Peter Nuyts to Japan where he learned about the Sinkanders. The shogun declined to meet the Dutch and gave the Sinkanders gifts. Nuyts arrived in Taiwan before the Sinkanders and refused to allow them to land before the Sinkanders were jailed and their gifts confiscated. The Japanese took Nuyts hostage and only released him in return for their safe passage back to Japan with 200 picols of silk as well as the Sinkanders' freedom and the return of their gifts. The Dutch blamed the Chinese for instigating the Sinkanders.

The Dutch dispatched a ship to repair relations with Japan but it was seized and its crew imprisoned upon arrival. The loss of the Japanese trade made the Taiwanese colony far less profitable and the authorities in Batavia considered abandoning it before the Council of Formosa urged them to keep it unless they wanted the Portuguese and Spanish to take over. In June 1630, Suetsugu died and his son, Masafusa, allowed the company officials to reestablish communication with the shogun. Nuyts was sent to Japan as a prisoner and remained there until 1636 when he returned to the Netherlands. After 1635, the shogun forbade Japanese from going abroad and eliminated the Japanese threat to the company. The VOC expanded into previous Japanese markets in Southeast Asia. In 1639, the shogun ended all contact with the Portuguese, the company's major silver trade competitor.

Descriptions of Taiwan

Captain Ripon was a French-speaking Swiss soldier from Lausanne. In 1617 he left for the Netherlands and initially served on a whaling expedition to Greenland before signing up for the Dutch East India Company. He was sent to Taiwan in 1623 to construct a fortress on the island. Shortly after finishing the fortress, Ripon was ordered to destroy the fortress and leave Taiwan. He wrote an account of his experiences.

Ripon's diary describes how he was sent to Tayouan where a small fortress was built. At the end of March 1624, Ripon's superiors ordered him to demolish the fortress, named Fort Oranje, and concentrate his forces at Penghu. On 30 July, the Ming navy reached the Dutch fort at Penghu with 5,000-10,000 soldiers and 40-50 warships and forced the Dutch to sue for peace on 3 August. The Dutch retreated to Tayouan and established a more permanent presence there. Ripon stayed behind to oversee the dismantling of the Penghu fortress. He left Penghu on 16 September. In Taiwan, Ripon was tasked with finding food. He had a falling out with the governor and left for Batavia in December.

According to Ripon, Taiwan looked like three mountains on top of each other with the highest covered in snow for three months a year. The streets of villages appeared narrow except at public squares at the center of which stood large round buildings. Men slept in these buildings and trained in the squares. He saw headhunting activity which occurred between the time of harvest until the next planting season. The heads of enemies were held in these men's houses, where a lamp burned at all times. They held celebrations in these places after returning from war. Successful head hunters were treated with reverence.

During his time in Taiwan, Ripon's party befriended the people of Bacaloan (modern Tainan) by giving them small gifts. They led him to the woods where he was free to gather lumber and in return Ripon gave them Indian fabrics. His friendship with Bacaloan angered the neighboring Mattau people who did not receive the same gifts. Ripon described the Mattau people as quite tall, "like big giants." They attacked Ripon's party. He blamed the Chinese for inciting the natives against them. A few months later both the Bacaloan and Mattau people attacked the Dutch fortress. Three hundred tried to storm the fort by night but were repelled by cannon fire.

Other descriptions of the indigenous people of Taiwan note that raids and ambushes were the common way of warfare. It was the convention for villages to officially declare war and to pay restitution for former raids. Alliances and peace were requested by sending weapons to the other side while sending gifts of trees meant submission. In 1630, Mattau built "a sturdy double wall around their village, the inside filled with clay, as well as a moat and many demi-lunes." Fortified villages seem to have been common in Taiwan until the 19th and 20th centuries. Besides villages, the Dutch also encountered a proto-state that was ruled by someone they referred to as the "Prince [vorst] of Lonkjouw." He ruled some 16 villages and their chiefs. Succession was hereditary.

Judging by Dutch sources, Taiwan's population was probably around 100,000 in this period, with a density of around 3 to 5 persons per square kilometer depending on the region. The southwestern plains was more densely populated. The low population density led to a higher nutritional diet. Europeans visiting Taiwan noted that the aborigines looked tall and healthy. There was an abundance of animal protein in the form of deer meat.

Spanish Formosa

In 1626, the Spanish Empire, viewing the Dutch presence on Taiwan as a threat to their colony in the Philippines, established a settlement at Santísima Trinidad on the northeast coast of Taiwan (modern Keelung), building Fort San Salvador. They also built Fort Santo Domingo in the northwest (modern Tamsui) in 1629 but abandoned it by 1638 due to conflicts with the local population. The small colony was plagued by disease, faced hostile locals, and received little support from Manila, who viewed the fortresses as a drain on their resources.

In August 1641, the Dutch and their native allies tried to take the Spanish fortresses but they did not have enough artillery and left. In August 1642, the Dutch ejected the Spanish from the north of the island.

Dutch colonization

According to Salvador Diaz, initially there were only 320 Dutch soldiers and they were "short, miserable, and very dirty." In 1624, the Dutch ship Golden Lion crashed into the coral reefs of Liuqiu Island and its crew was killed by the natives. In 1631, another ship wrecked on the reefs and its survivors were also killed by the inhabitants of Liuqiu Island. In 1633, an expedition consisting of 250 Dutch soldiers, 40 Chinese pirates, and 250 Taiwanese natives were sent against Liuqiu Island but met with little success.

The Dutch allied with Sinkan, a small village that provided them with firewood, venison and fish. In 1625, they bought a piece of land from the Sinkanders and built the town of Sakam for Dutch and Chinese merchants. Initially the other villages maintained peace with the Dutch but a series of events from 1625 to 1629 eroded this peace. In 1625, the Dutch attacked 170 Chinese pirates in Wankan but were driven off, damaging their reputation. Encouraged by the Dutch failure, Mattau warriors raided Sinkan, believing that the Dutch could not defend them. The Dutch returned with their ships and drove off the pirates later, restoring their reputation. Mattau was then forced to return the property stolen from Sinkan and make reparation. The people of Sinkan then attacked Mattau and Baccluan before seeking the Dutch for protection. Feeling that the Dutch could not sufficiently protect them, the people of Sinkan went to Japan for protection. In 1629, Pieter Nuyts visited Sinkan with 60 musketeers. After leaving the next morning, the musketeers were killed in an ambush by Mattau and Soulang warriors while crossing a stream. Nuyts avoided the ambush since he left the evening prior.

On 23 November 1629, an expedition set out and burned most of Baccluan, killing many of its people, who the Dutch believed harbored proponents of the previous massacre. Baccluan, Mattau, and Soulang people continued to harass company employees in the following years. This changed in late 1633 when Mattau and Soulang went to war with each other. Mattau won the fight but the Dutch were able to exploit the division.

In 1634, Batavia sent reinforcements. In 1635, 475 soldiers from Batavia arrived in Taiwan. By this point even Sinkan was on bad terms with the Dutch. Soldiers were sent into the village and arrested those who plotted rebellion. In the winter of 1635 the Dutch defeated Mattau, who had been troubling them since 1623. Baccluan, north of the town of Sakam, was also defeated. In 1636, a large expedition was sent against Liuqiu Island. The Dutch and their allies chased about 300 inhabitants into caves, sealed the entrances, and killed them with poisonous fumes over eight days. The native population of 1100 was removed from the island. They were enslaved with the men sent to Batavia while the women and children became servants and wives for the Dutch officers. The Dutch planned to depopulate the outlying islands while working closely with allied natives. The villages of Taccariang, Soulang, and Tevorang were also pacified. In 1642, the Dutch massacred the people of Liuqiu island again.

Administration
The Dutch estimated in 1650 that there were around 50,000 natives in the western plains region. According to documents in 1650, the Dutch Formosa ruled around "315 tribal villages with a total population of around 68,600, estimated 40-50% of the entire indigenes of the island". Taiwanese aboriginals were frequently employed as foot soldiers by the Dutch. The Dutch tried to convince the natives to give up hunting and adopt sedentary farming but their efforts were unsuccessful.

The VOC administered the island and its predominantly aboriginal population until 1662. They set up a tax system and schools to teach romanized script of aboriginal languages and evangelize Christianity. The native Taiwanese religion was primarily animist and considered sinful and less civilized. Practices like mandatory abortion, marital infidelity, nakedness, and non-observation of the Christian Sabbath were also considered sinful. The Bible was translated into the native languages. This was the first entrance of Christianity into Taiwan. The missionaries set up schools in villages to teach Christianity, reading, and writing. The natives did not have a writing system so the missionaries created a number of romanization schemes for the various Formosan languages. They tried to teach the native children the Dutch language but the effort was abandoned after failing to produce good results.

The Dutch levied a tax on all imports and exports. There are no records of the rates of such taxation. A tax was also levied on every non-Dutch person above the age of six. This poll tax was highly unpopular and the cause the major insurrections in 1640 and 1652. A tax was imposed on hunting through licenses to dig pit-traps and for snaring. Although its control was mainly limited to the western plain of the island, the Dutch systems were adopted by succeeding occupiers.

The Dutch originally sought to use their castle Zeelandia at Tayowan as a trading base between Japan and China, but soon realized the potential of the huge deer populations that roamed in herds of thousands along the alluvial plains of Taiwan's western regions.

Chinese settlers

The VOC encouraged Chinese migration to Taiwan. The Dutch colony provided a military and administrative structure for Chinese immigration. It advertised to the Chinese through coastal entrepreneurs free land, freedom from taxes, the use of oxen, and loans. Sometimes they even paid the Chinese to move to Taiwan. As a result, thousands of Chinese crossed the strait and became rice and sugar planters. The Chinese settlers were of Hakka and Hokkien stock during the Dutch period. Most of them were young single men seeking to hide from Qing authorities or to hunt in Taiwan. They referred to Taiwan as The Gate of Hell for its reputation in taking the lives of sailors and explorers.

In 1625, the company started advertising Provintia to the Chinese as a site of settlement. The next year the town caught fire and shortly afterward it was beset by fever. The Chinese all fled and all the company employees grew sick. The company withdrew personnel from the town and destroyed the fortress. In 1629, the natives of Mattau and Soulang attacked Sakam and chased away the inhabitants of Provintia. In 1632, the company began encouraging Chinese to plant sugarcane in Sakam by providing them money and cattle. The efforts came to fruition and by 1634 there was sugar "as white as that of China." By 1635, Chinese entrepreneurs were preparing for larger plantations. In the spring, 300 Chinese laborers arrived. The Chinese also cultivated rice but access to water was difficult and by 1639 the Chinese had lost their desire to plant rice. This problem was addressed in the early 1640s and rice production began to grow again. Other industries began to spring up: butchers, blacksmiths, coopers, carpenters, curriers, cobblers, masons, tailors among them. In the 1640s the Dutch began to tax them, reaping large benefits, causing some Chinese to become discontent. After 1648, nearly all company revenue came from the Chinese.

The Chinese were allowed property rights in a limited area and the Dutch made efforts to prevent the Chinese from mingling with the natives. Initially the company policy was to protect the Chinese from the natives but later the policy shifted to trying to keep Chinese from influencing the natives. The native people traded meat and hides for salt, iron, and clothing from Chinese traders who sometimes stayed in their villages. In the interior, deer skins were traded by the aborigines. In 1634 the Dutch ordered the Chinese to sell deerskins to no one but the company since the Japanese offered better prices. By 1636, Chinese hunters were entering previously native-lands where the Dutch had removed the natives to greater profit from the deer economy. Commercial hunters replaced the natives and used the pitfall to increase deer products. By 1638 the future of the deer population was being questioned. Restrictions were put on hunting periods but this proved insufficient so the use of the pitfall was also restricted.

In 1636, Favorolang, the largest aboriginal village north of Mattau, killed three Chinese and wounded several others while harassing Chinese hunters and fishers. In August a large band of Favorolangers appeared at Wankan north of Fort Zeelandia. In November the Favorolangers captured a Chinese fishing vessel. The next year the Dutch and their native allies defeated Favorolang. The expedition was paid for by the Chinese populace. When peace negotiations failed, the Dutch blamed a group of Chinese at Favorolang. The Favorolangers continued to attack hunters even in fields belonging to other villages until 1638. In 1640 an incident involving the capture of a Favorolang leader and the ensuing death of three Dutch hunters near Favorolang resulted in the banning of Chinese hunters from Favorolang territory. The Dutch blamed the Chinese and orders were given from Batavia to restrict Chinese residency and travel. No Chinese vessel was allowed around Taiwan unless it carried a company license. An expedition was ordered to chase away the Chinese from the land and to subjugate the natives to the north. In November 1642, an expedition set out northward, killing 19 natives and 11 Chinese, and executing the Chinese and natives responsible for the murder of three Dutchmen. A policy banning any Chinese from living north of Mattau was implemented. In 1644 the Chinese were allowed to live in Favorolang to conduct trade if they purchased a permit. The Favorolangers were told that the Chinese "were despicable people [vuyle menschen] who sought to instill in them false opinions of us [the Dutch]" and to capture any Chinese who did not possess a permit.

In the late 1630s, officials in Batavia started pressuring the authority in Taiwan to increase revenues. The Dutch started collecting voluntary donations from the Chinese but these donations were not reliable. In addition to a 10 percent tax on venison, beer, salt, mullet, arrack, bricks and mortar, and real estate sales, they also implemented a residency-permit tax (hoofdbrieven). In August and September 1640, some 3,568 Chinese were charged a quarter of a real per month, increasing to some 4,450 Chinese payments on average. All male Chinese were taxed for residency. Checks were made by soldiers at inspection points so that the Chinese could not move to another village without permission. Any transgression could be punished with a fine, beating, or imprisonment. Chinese settlers began protesting the residency tax, that the Dutch harassed them on roads for pay. In 1646, the Council informed the Chinese that they only had to answer to specific officials, however complaints continued. According to a report, "soldiers not only confiscate their hoofdbrieven, in order to prosecute them and demand a fine, but also take their meager possessions, seizing anything they can get their hands on, whether chickens, pigs, rice, clothing, bedding, or furniture.

The Dutch also auctioned off the collection of taxes for rice farming and sold the right to trade with aboriginal villages. However the Dutch thought the Chinese were exploiting the natives by selling at high prices: "for the Chinese . . . are even more deceptive and deceitful than the Jews, and will not sell their goods . . . for a more civil price unless [the company] stopped selling leases altogether." The sale of rights to trade with aborigines was not just a way to raise profits but to keep track of the Chinese and prevent them from mingling with the natives. Policing the rights to trade in aboriginal villages and alterations to the system eventually caused the reputation of the company to drop, gaining for them a reputation of tyranny.

Chinese rebellions

In the late 1640s, increased population, higher rice prices, and Dutch taxes pressured the Chinese population into violence. In 1643, a pirate named Kinwang began attacking aboriginal villages. For several months Kinwang and his followers sailed around Taiwan attacking inland aboriginal villages. In 1644 his junk stranded in the Bay of Lonkjauw and the natives captured him, handing him over to the Dutch. Although he was executed, a document in his possession was found appealing to the Chinese who chaffed under Dutch taxes and their restrictions on trading and hunting. The document said the pirates would protect them and kill any natives who sought to harm them.

On 7 September 1652, it was reported that a Chinese farmer, Guo Huaiyi, had gathered an army of peasants armed with bamboo spears and harvest knives to attack Sakam. They attacked the next morning. Most of the Dutch were able to find refuge in the company's horse stables but others were captured and executed. A company of 120 Dutch soldiers shot at a peasant army 4,000 strong and scattered them. The Dutch told the natives that they would be rewarded with Indian textiles if they helped fight the Chinese. Over the next two days, native warriors and Dutch warriors killed around 500 Chinese, most of whom were hiding in the sugarcane fields. On 11 September, four or five thousand Chinese rebels clashed with the company soldiers and their native allies. After suffering two thousand casualties, the rebels fled south, only to be killed by a large force of natives. In total some 4,000 Chinese were killed and Guo Huaiyi's head was displayed on a stake.

Although easily put down, the rebellion and its ensuing massacre of Chinese destroyed the rural labor force since most of the rebels were farmers. Although the crops were fairly unharmed, the company could not obtain the required labor to harvest them, resulting in a below average harvest for 1653. However thousands of Chinese migrated to Taiwan due to war on the mainland and a modest recovery of agriculture occurred the next year. Measure were taken to suppress the Chinese and anti-Chinese rhetoric increased. Natives were reminded to keep an eye on the Chinese and not to engage in unnecessary contact with them. The Dutch portrayed themselves as protectors of aboriginal land against Chinese encroachment. In terms of military preparations, little was done except to build a small thinly walled fort. The Dutch did not feel threatened because most of the rebels were agriculturalists while the rich Chinese had sided with the Dutch and warned them of the rebellion.

In May 1654, Fort Zeelandia was afflicted by a swarm of locusts, then a plague that killed thousands of natives, Dutch, and Chinese, and then an earthquake that destroyed homes and buildings with aftershocks lasting seven weeks.

Zheng Chenggong

Ming-Qing war
Zheng Chenggong, known in Dutch sources as Koxinga, was the son of Zheng Zhilong. By 1640, Zhilong had become military commander of Fujian Province. Chenggong spent the first seven years of his life in Japan with his mother and then went to school in Fujian, obtaining a county-level licentiate at the age of 15. Afterwards he left for Nanjing to study at the Imperial Academy. After Beijing fell in 1644 to rebels, Chenggong and his followers declared their loyalty to the Ming dynasty and he was bestowed the title Guoxingye, or Lord of the Imperial surname, pronounced "Kok seng ia" in southern Fujianese, from which Koxinga is derived. His father Zhilong aided the Longwu Emperor in a military expedition in 1646, but Longwu was captured and executed. In November 1646, Zhilong declared his loyalty to the Qing and lived out the rest of his life under house arrest in Beijing. Chenggong continued the resistance against the Qing from Xiamen, which was named "Memorial Prefecture for the Ming" in 1654. In 1649, Chenggong gained control over Quanzhou but then lost it. Further attacks further afield resulted in even less success. In 1650 he planned a major northward offensive from Guangdong in conjunction with a Ming loyalist in Guangxi. The Qing deployed a large army to the area and Chenggong decided to take his chances by ferrying his army along the coast but a storm hindered his movements. The Qing launched a surprise attack on Xiamen, forcing him to return to protect it. From 1656 to 1658 he planned to take Nanjing. In the summer of 1658 he completed his preparations and set sail with his fleet but a storm turned him back. On July 7, 1659, Chenggong's fleet set sail again and his army encircled Nanjing on 24 August. Qing reinforcements arrived and broke Chenggong's army, forcing them to retreat to Xiamen with many of the veterans and thousands of soldiers killed or captured. In 1660 the Qing embarked on a coastal evacuation policy to starve Chenggong of his source of livelihood.

Trade war

Chenggong had cordial relations with the VOC during most of the 1640s and early 1650s. However some of the rebels during the Guo Huaiyi rebellion had expected Chenggong to come to their aid. Some company officials believed that the rebellion had been inciteded by Chenggong. A Jesuit priest told the Dutch that Chenggong was looking at Taiwan as a new base of operations. In 1654, he sent a letter to Taiwan to have a Dutch surgeon sent to Xiamen for medical assistance. In the spring of 1655 no silk junks arrived in Taiwan. Company officials suspected that this was caused by the Ming-Qing war but others felt it was a deliberate plan by Chenggong to cause them harm. The company sent a junk to Penghu to see whether Chenggong was preparing forces there but they found nothing. Defenses at Fort Zeelandia were strengthened. According to European and Chinese traders, Chenggong had 300,000 men and 3,000 junks. In 1655, the governor of Taiwan received a letter from Chenggong insulting the Dutch, calling them "more like animals than Christians," and referring to the Chinese in Taiwan as his subjects. He commanded them to stop trading with the Spanish. Chenggong sent a letter directly to the Chinese leaders in Taiwan, rather than Dutch authorities, stating that he would withhold his junks from trading in Taiwan if the Dutch would not guarantee his junks safety from Dutch depredations in Southeast Asia. To raise funds for his war effort, Chenggong had increased foreign trade by sending junks to Japan, Tonkin, Cambodia, Palembang, and Malaka. Batavia was wary of this competition and wrote that this would "undermine our profits." Batavia sent a small fleet to Southeast Asian ports to intercept Chenggong's junks. One junk was captured and its cargo of peppers confiscated but another junk managed to escape. The Dutch realized this would be received badly by Chenggong and thus offered an alliance with the Manchus in Beijing, however nothing came of the negotiations.

The Taiwanese trade slowed and for several months in late 1655 and early 1656 not a single Chinese vessel arrived in Tayouan. Even low-cost goods grew scarce and as demand for them rose, the value of aboriginal products fell. Chinese merchants in Taiwan suffered because they could not take their products to China to sell. The system of selling Chinese merchants the right to trade in aboriginal villages fell apart as did many of the other revenue systems supporting the company's profits. On 9 July 1656, a junk flying Chenggong's flag arrived at Fort Zeelandia. It carried an edit instructed to be handed over to the Chinese leaders of Taiwan. Chenggong wrote that he was angry with the Dutch but since Chinese people lived in Taiwan, he would allow them to trade on the Chinese coast for 100 days so long as only Taiwanese products were sold. The Dutch confiscated the letter but the damage had been done. Chinese merchants who depended on trade of foreign wares began leaving with their families. Chenggong made good on his edict and confiscated a Chinese junk from Tayouan trading pepper in Xiamen, causing Chinese merchants to abort their trade voyages. A Chinese official arrived in Tayouan carrying a document with Chenggong's seal demanding to inspect all the junks in Tayouan and their cargoes. It referred to the Chinese in Taiwan as his subjects. Chinese merchants refused to buy the company's foreign wares and even sold their own foreign wares, causing prices to collapse. Soon, Tayouan was devoid of junks.

The embargo imposed by Chenggong hurt the company's profits by ending the import of gold, which was the main item used to exchange for company goods in India. Chinese merchants in aboriginal villages ran out of goods to trade for aboriginal products. Chinese farmers also suffered  due to the exodus of Chinese from Taiwan. They could not export their rice and sugar and their investments in fields and labor came to nothing. By the end of 1656, Chinese farmers were asking for relief from debts to the company and even requested help in the form of guaranteed prices for their goods. Many Chinese could barely find food for themselves while students in mission schools ran short of Chinese paper. Some company officials believed the embargo was a prelude to an invasion while others thought it was to obtain favorable trading privileges with the company. The Chinese mostly thought it was due to Dutch depredations on Chenggong's junks and that the embargo would not last much longer since it also hurt Chenggong's profits. The Chinese sent presents and a letter to Chenggong urging him to reopen trade to Taiwan but no reply was received. The Dutch also sent letters to Chenggong through a Chinese intermediary named He Tingbin.

End of Dutch rule

A man working for the VOC named He Bin fled to Zheng Chenggong's base in Xiamen and provided him with a map of Taiwan. On 23 March 1661, Zheng's fleet set sail from Kinmen (Quemoy) with a large fleet carrying around 25,000 soldiers and sailors aboard. They arrived at Penghu the next day and on 30 March, a small garrison was left at Penghu while the main body of the fleet arrived at Tayouan on 2 April. Zheng's forces routed 240 Dutch soldiers at Baxemboy Island in the Bay of Taiwan. They landed at the bay of Luermen. Three Dutch ships attacked the Chinese junks and destroyed several until their main warship, the Hector, exploded due to a cannon firing near its gunpowder supply. The remaining two ships consisted of a yacht and a lesser warship, which were unable to keep Zheng from controlling the waters around Taiwan. The landing forces defeated the Dutch.

On 4 April, Fort Provintia surrendered to the Zheng forces. On 7 April, Zheng's army surrounded Fort Zeelandia and bombarded the fort with 28 cannons. An assault on the fort failed and many of Zheng's best soldiers died, after which Zheng decided to starve out the defenders. On 28 May, news of the siege reached Jakarta, and the company dispatched a fleet of 12 ships and 700 sailors to relieve the fort. The reinforcements met with bad weather and a shipwreck that had an entire crew captured by natives and sent to the Zheng camp. Fighting between the Dutch and Zheng ships lasted from July to October when the Dutch ultimately failed to relieve the siege after losing several ships. They retreated with two ships sunk, three smaller ships captured, and 130 casualties. In January 1662, a German sergeant named Hans Jurgen Radis defected and informed the Zheng forces of a weakness in the fort's defenses. On 12 January, Zheng's ships initiated a bombardment while the land forces prepared to assault. The Dutch surrendered. On 9 February the remaining company personnel in Fort Zeelandia left Taiwan.

Dutch ships continued to come into conflict with Zheng forces in the 17th century and in 1663, the Dutch officially became allies of the Qing dynasty against the Zheng forces. The Dutch looted a Buddhist complex on the Zhoushan islands in 1665 and slaughtered its monks. The Dutch held out at Keelung until 1668 when their presence became untenable due to hostile natives and withdrew from Taiwan completely.

Kingdom of Tungning (1661–1683)

Conquest

The Kingdom of Tungning started out as a Ming dynasty loyalist movement led by Zheng Chenggong (Koxinga). On mainland China, the Manchu-led Qing dynasty forces broke through Shanhai Pass in 1644 and rapidly overwhelmed the Ming. In 1661, a naval fleet led by the Ming loyalist Koxinga arrived in Taiwan to oust the Dutch and establish a pro-Ming base in Taiwan. Koxinga was born to Zheng Zhilong, a Chinese merchant and pirate, and Tagawa Matsu, a Japanese woman, in 1624 in Hirado, Nagasaki Prefecture, Japan. He was raised there until the age seven and moved to Quanzhou, in Fujian province, China. In a family made wealthy from shipping and piracy, Koxinga inherited his father's trade networks. Following the Qing advance on Fujian, Koxinga retreated from his stronghold in Amoy (Xiamen city) and attacked the Dutch colony in Taiwan in the hope of establishing a strategic base to marshal his troops to retake his base at Amoy. In 1662, following a nine-month siege, Koxinga captured the Dutch fortress Zeelandia and Taiwan became his base (see Kingdom of Tungning).

The Taiwanese Aboriginal tribes who were previously allied with the Dutch against the Chinese during the Guo Huaiyi Rebellion in 1652 turned against the Dutch during the Siege of Fort Zeelandia and defected to Koxinga's Chinese forces. The Aboriginals (Formosans) of Sincan defected to Koxinga after he offered them amnesty. The Sincan Aboriginals then proceeded to work for the Chinese and behead Dutch people in executions. The frontier aboriginals in the mountains and plains also surrendered and defected to the Chinese on 17 May 1661, celebrating their freedom from compulsory education under the Dutch rule by hunting down Dutch people and beheading them and trashing their Christian school textbooks.

Koxinga renamed Fort Zeelandia to Anping and Provintia to Chikan. The town surrounding Chikan came to be known as Chengtian. On 29 May 1662, Chikan was renamed to "Ming Eastern Capital" (Dongdu Mingjing). Later "Eastern Capital" (Dongdu) was renamed to Dongning (Wades Giles: Tungning), which means "Eastern Pacification," by Zheng Jing, Koxinga's son. One prefecture and two counties (Tianxing and Wannian) were established in Taiwan.

In April 1662, Koxinga sent a message to Manila demanding annual tribute. Sabiniano Manrique de Lara, the Spanish Governor-General of the Philippines, rejected the request and strengthened defenses in anticipation of an attack. The non-Christian Chinese population was also dispersed. Tensions eased after Koxinga died on 23 June, four months after the end of the siege of Fort Zeelandia. It is uncertain how he died and causes range from malaria to pneumonia to dysentery. One version of events say he died in a fit of madness when his officers refused his orders to execute his son, Zheng Jing, who had an affair with his wet nurse and conceived a child with her. Koxinga became a legendary figure in folk tales and his image as a Ming loyalist was honored even by the Kangxi Emperor of the Qing dynasty, who removed his name from the "sea banditry" category and labelled him a valiant loyalist to a deposed dynasty. Chinese nationalists in the 20th century invoked Koxinga for his patriotism and political loyalty against Qing and foreign influence.

Zheng Jing

Retreat to Taiwan
Zheng Jing's succession was met with dissension in Taiwan, where the leaders made Zheng Miao, Zheng Chenggong's fifth son, the successor. With the support of Xiamen's commanders, Zheng Jing arrived in Taiwan in December 1662 and defeated his political enemies. The political infighting caused some followers to become disillusioned and defect to the Qing. From September 1661 to August 1662, some 290 officers, 4,334 soldiers, and 467 civilians left Zheng Taiwan. Three leading Zheng commanders contacted Qing authorities with the intention to defect but Zheng Jing imprisoned them. The defections continued and by 1663, some 3,985 officials and officers, 40,962 soldiers, 64,230 civilians, and 900 ships in Fujian had defected from Zheng held territory. To combat population decline, Zheng Jing also promoted migration to Taiwan. Between 1665 and 1669 a large number of Fujianese moved to Taiwan under Zheng rule. In a few years, some 9,000 Chinese were brought to Taiwan by Zheng Jing.

The Qing dynasty enacted a sea-ban on coastal China to starve out the Zheng forces. In 1663, the writer Xia Lin who lived in Xiamen testified that the Zhengs were short on supplies and the people suffered tremendous hardship due to the Qing sea ban policy. After Zheng forces retreated completely from the coast of Fujian in 1669, the Qing started relaxing restrictions on maritime trade.

From June to August 1663, Duke Huang Wu of Haicheng and commander Shi Lang of Tongan urged the Qing court to take Xiamen, and made plans for an attack in October. The Dutch too had attacked Zheng ships in Xiamen but failed to take the town. In August the Dutch contacted Qing authorities in Fujian to propose a joint expedition against Zheng Taiwan. The message did not reach the Qing court until 7 January 1663 and it took another four months for a reply. The Kangxi Emperor granted the Dutch permission to set up inland trading posts but declined the proposal for a joint expedition. The Dutch did however assist the Qing in naval combat against the Zheng fleet in October 1663, resulting in the capture of Zheng bases in Xiamen and Kinmen in November. The Zheng admiral Zhou Quanbin surrendered on 20 November. The remaining Zheng forces fled southward and completely evacuated from the mainland coast in the spring of 1664.

Qing-Dutch forces attempted to invade Taiwan twice in December 1664. On both occasions Admiral Shi Lang turned back his ships due to adverse weather. Shi Lang tried to attack Taiwan again in 1666 but turned back due to a storm. The Dutch continued to attack Zheng ships from time to time, disrupting trade, and occupied Keelung until 1668, but they were unable to take back the island. Their position at sea was gradually taken over by Great Britain. On 10 September 1670, a representative from the British East India Company signed a trade agreement with Zheng Taiwan.

Peace negotiations
After Zheng Jing's forces were ejected from the mainland, the Qing tried to win over Zheng through negotiation. In 1667 letters were sent to Zheng Taiwan to negotiate their surrender. Zheng Jing declined the offer. Zheng emphasized that Taiwan had never been part of China and that he wished to establish relations with the Qing based on a model similar to a foreign country. However the Ming loyalist Zha Jizu noted in 1669 that Zheng Jing continued to use the defunct Ming dynasty's calendar. He never gave up on aspirations for power on the mainland and later attacked the Qing dynasty during the Revolt of the Three Feudatories, taking settlements on the coast.

General Kong Yuanzhang, who had defected to the Qing, personally visited Zheng Jing in Taiwan in November 1667. He returned in December with nothing but reports of gracious treatment and gifts of precious items. In 1669 the Qing offered the Zhengs significant autonomy in Taiwan if they shaved their heads and wore their hair in the Manchu style. Zheng Jing declined and insisted on a relationship with the Qing similar to Korea. After the military conflict with Zheng during the Three Feudatories revolt, the Kangxi Emperor made clear that he considered all the southern Fujianese living in Taiwan to be Chinese, unlike the Koreans, and that they must shave their heads.

Revolt of the Three Feudatories

In 1670 and 1673, Zheng forces seized tributary vessels on their way to the mainland from Ryukyu. In 1671, Zheng forces raided the coast of Zhejiang and Fujian. In 1674, Zheng Jing took advantage of the Revolt of the Three Feudatories on the mainland and recaptured Xiamen and used it as a trading center to fund his efforts to retake mainland China. He imported swords, gun barrels, knives, armours, lead and saltpeter, and other components for gunpowder. Zheng made an alliance with the rebel lord Geng Jingzhong in Fujian, but they fell afoul of each other not long afterward. Zheng captured Quanzhou and Zhangzhou in 1674. In 1675, the commander of Chaozhou, Liu Jingzhong, defected to Zheng. After Geng and other rebels surrendered to the Qing in 1676 and 1677, the tide turned against the Zheng forces. Quanzhou was lost to the Qing on 12 March 1677 and then Zhangzhou and Haicheng on 5 April. Zheng forces counterattacked and retook Haicheng in August. Zheng naval forces blockaded Quanzhou and tried to retake the city in August 1678 but they were forced to retreat in October when Qing reinforcements arrived. Zheng forces suffered heavy casualties in a battle in January 1679.

On 6 March 1680, the Qing fleet led by Admiral Wan Zhengse moved against Zheng naval forces near Quanzhou and defeated them on 20 March with assistance from land-based artillery. The sudden retreat of Zheng naval forces caused widespread panic on land and many Zheng commanders and soldiers defected to the Qing. Xiamen was abandoned. On 10 April, Zheng Jing's war on the mainland came to a close.

Zheng Jing died in early 1681.

Sinicization

Zheng Jing was raised on a Confucian education and had a very rigid understanding of what was "Chinese" and "barbarian". He had a hatred of Manchus. In 1657 he had a Chinese Christian seized and threatened to execute him because he wore his hair in the Manchu style. Zheng and his ministers often held banquets reminiscing about the fall of the Ming dynasty. According to Zheng, the suicide of the Chongzhen Emperor was "a most miserable plight, alas, unseen since antiquity!" Zheng blamed the incompetence of the Ming loyalists on the mainland in resisting the Manchus. He referred to the Manchus in derogatory terms and accused them of perverse religious customs such as incest.

Zheng Jing never relinquished the trappings of a Ming government such as the use of the Yongli calendar and drew on this claim for legitimacy. He treated the deceased Yongli Emperor as though he were still alive and paid homage to him on the Lunar New Year. This enabled him to enlist the support of Ming loyalists who helped him establish an administration in Taiwan. The Six Ministries were established: Works, Rites, Punishment, Revenue, Military, and Personnel. Civil officials were instated with statuses theoretically equal to their military counterparts. However oversight of all affairs were given to Chen Yonghua, the Advisory Staff Officers, and Feng Xifan, head of the Imperial Bodyguard. Zheng's family members and officers remained at the top of the organizational hierarchy. They enacted programs of farm development, house and temple construction, and Confucian education. By 1666, grain harvests were able to keep soldiers and civilians well nourished while sugarcane plantations proved profitable. Aside from agricultural development, Zheng advised commoners to replace their grass huts with houses made of wood and baked tiles. He ordered temples worshiping the Buddha and local Fujianese deities to be constructed. An Imperial Academy and Confucian Shrine were established in 1665 and 1666. A regular cvil service examination system was implemented for selecting talent to manage Taiwanese affairs.

Zheng dispatched teachers to various aboriginal tribes to provide them with animals, tools, and know how on advanced and intensive farming techniques. Schools were set up to teach the aboriginal people the Chinese language. Those who refused were punished. Extensive farming spread Han Chinese settlements to the southern tip of the island and as far north as modern Hsinchu, often at the expense of aboriginal tribes. Several rebellions flared up over the course of Zheng rule due to Han Chinese incursions on indigenous ways of life. In one pacification campaign, Liu Guoxuan, stationed in modern Changhua County, killed several hundred Shalu tribes people in modern Taichung, leaving only six alive. By the start of 1684, a year after the end of Zheng rule, areas under cultivation in Taiwan had reached 43,699.7 hectares, more than triple the figure of 12,500 hectares by the end of the Dutch era in 1660.

According to a 1668 memorial memorial to the Qing court, Shi Lang claimed there were 20,000 to 30,000 Han Chinese in Taiwan under the Dutch. Zheng Chenggong brought with him another 30,000 soldiers and their families while Zheng Jing took another 6,000 to 7,000. Most of the soldiers became farmers. Half of them did not have wives or families. According to the poet Shen Guangwen, Zheng disbanded the troops and turned them into military colonies. Shen and other literati abandoned Zheng once they realized he lacked the ability to retake the mainland and was permanently settling in Taiwan. According to one of Shen's poems, he often looked to the west for good news from the mainland but had to flee north out of fear of alienation from the group. Zheng justified the new direction by saying that in thirty years, Taiwan would be able to compete with the Central Plains. This was not entirely unfounded. According to a 1665 inscription by the poet Wang Zhongxiao: "Once the Imperial Surname [Zheng Chenggong] governed this land, the Chinese people came one after another. In Anping of Dongning, I only see and hear Chinese. The people here are people of the Middle Kingdom, and the soil is the soil of the Middle Kingdom." In later negotiations with the Qing, Zheng Jing described himself as the ruler of the Kingdom of Dongning. He boasted that he had nothing to envy about the Central Lands and that many barbarians paid obeisance to him. Zheng agreed to relations with the Qing based on a model such as Korea, that was functionally independent, but the Qing refused his offer.

The Zheng merchant fleets continued to operate between Japan and Southeast Asian countries, reaping profits as a center of trade. Private traders paid Zheng authorities a gift, or tributary tax, for safe passage through the Taiwan Strait. Zheng Taiwan held a monopoly on certain commodities such as deer skin and sugarcane, which sold at a high price in Japan. Unlike the Dutch East India Company, under which almost 90 percent of levies were related to commercial activities, there was greater emphasis on the rapid production of grains such as rice and yam to meet basic subsistence needs. Levies under Zheng governance were fixed and led to a decrease in commercial potential and lower incremental revenues. However the Zheng achieved greater economic diversification than the profit-driven Dutch colony and cultivated more types of grain, vegetables, fruits, and seafood. By the end of Zheng rule in 1683, the government was extracting an annual income of 4,033 kg of silver in Taiwan, more than a 30 percent increase from the 3,145.9 kg under the Dutch in 1655. Sugar exports reached 1,194,000 kg a year, exceeding the peak of 1,032,810 kg under the Dutch in 1658. Output of deerskin remained the same.

End of Zheng rule

Shi Lang

Admiral Shi Lang of the Qing dynasty was born in Jinjiang, Fujian in 1621 and became a soldier in the service of Zheng Zhilong at the age of 17. Shi served with distinction until he had a falling out with Zheng Chenggong. He quarreled with another commander, Chen Bin, and Chenggong took Chen's side. Shi also disagreed with Chenggong on strategic matters. Shi threatened to leave and become a monk, which annoyed Chenggong. Chenggong eventually imprisoned Shi for criticizing his behavior, which Shi described as being no different than that of a pirate. A relative of Shi's falsified orders from Chenggong to take Shi out for interrogation and he seized the opportunity to escape. Shi tried to seek mediation with Chenggong but his efforts failed and instead Chenggong sent an assassin after him. The assassination attempt failed. Chenggong executed Shi's father and brother in 1651, resulting in Shi's defection to the Qing.

Shi was assigned to follow Geng Jimao and pacify Ming loyalists in Guangdong and Guangxi before returning to Fujian in 1655. Shi was assigned to an assault force on a Zheng stronghold at the suggestion of another commander, Huang Wu, who had also defected from the Zheng side. The successful attack saw the surrender of Chen Bin and execution of 500 Zheng captives. In 1658, Shi was made Deputy Commander of Tongan. He continued to participate in campaigns against the Zhengs. Shi passed on information such as Zheng internal conflict between Chenggong and his son onto Beijing.

The Qing established a naval force in Fujian in 1662 and appointed Shi Lang as the commander. Huang and Shi advocated for more aggressive action against the Zhengs besides just a coastal evacuation policy. On 15 May 1663, Shi attacked the Zheng fleet and succeeded in capturing 24 Zheng officers, 5 ships, and killing over 200 enemies. Shi planned to attack Xiamen on 19 September, but the Qing court decided to postpone the assault until Dutch naval reinforcements arrived. From 18 to 20 November, the Dutch fought sea battles against the Zheng while Shi took Xiamen. In 1664, Shi assembled a fleet of 240 ships, and in conjunction with 16,500 troops, chased remaining Zheng forces south. They failed to dislodge the last Zheng stronghold due to the departure of the Dutch fleet. However, after the defection of Zheng commander Zhou Quanbin, Zheng Jing decided to pull out from the remaining mainland stronghold in the spring of 1664.

Shi was not content with just the defeat of Zheng forces on the mainland. He proposed to the Qing court an invasion of Penghu and Taiwan. In November 1644, Shi's fleet set sail but was turned back by a storm. He tried again in May 1665 but there was too little wind to move the ships and then a few days later the winds reversed direction and forced him to return. Another failed attempt was made in June when they were met with a violent storm, sinking a few small ships, and damaging the masts of several other ships. Shi's flagship was blown to the coast of Guangdong on 30 June. In 1666, the Qing called off the expedition.

Preparations

Shi Lang was instructed to arrange the necessary ships, escorts, and provisions for a peace mission to Taiwan, but he did not believe Zheng Jing would accept the Qing's terms. He delivered a memorial to Beijing on 7 January 1668 and warned that if the Zhengs built up their strength, they would pose a serious danger. Shi detailed his plans to invade Taiwan with just 20,000 men and 170 battle ships. He required 10 new battle ships and 20 troop transports to be constructed. He argued that by securing Taiwan, the numerous garrisons along the coastline would be rendered unnecessary and reduce the defense spending.

After Kong Yuanzhang returned from his failed peace mission to Taiwan in 1667, he accused Shi of collusion with Zheng Jing. Shi was recalled from Fujian and his officers and soldiers were relocated to hinterland provinces. Some of them defected back to the Zhengs. The Fujian Naval Command was abrogated and Shi was given a leisurely post as one of the emperor's six grand guardsmen. Shi was not the only one who proposed more aggressive action against Taiwan. On 14 August 1668, Zhejiang official Shi Weiqi recommended imposing an economic blockade on Taiwan, which the Qing rejected.

The Fujian Naval Command was revived under Wang Zhiding on 9 January 1679 but Wang quit the job a few months later and admitted he was not suitable for the position. Wan Zhengse, who defected from the Zhengs in 1663, was appointed to replace Wang in May. Wan was opposed to an invasion of Taiwan and was adamant that such an attempt would end in failure. Wan's lack of confidence upset the Kangxi Emperor. In 1681, the Neo-Confucian scholar Li Guangdi recommended Shi Lang to be the coordinator of the invasion force. Shi was reappointed as the naval chief of Fujian on 10 September 1681. He assumed his duty in Xiamen on 15 November at the age of 61.

Admiral Shi's plan was to take Penghu first and then use it as a base to launch further operations. If the Zhengs did not surrender, Penghu would be used as a base for a Qing invasion into Taiwan. The Governor-general Yao Qisheng disagreed with Shi's plan to take Penghu first and proposed a two pronged attack on Tamsui and Penghu at the same time. Shi thought the proposal was unrealistic and requested to be put in total control over the entire invasion force. Kangxi denied the request.

In Taiwan, Zheng Jing's death resulted in a coup shortly afterward. Zheng Keshuang murdered his brother Zheng Kezang with the support of minister Feng Xifan. Political turmoil, heavy taxes, an epidemic in the north, a large fire that caused the destruction of more than a thousand houses, and suspicion of collusion with the Qing caused more Zheng followers to defect to the Qing. Zheng's deputy Commander Liu Bingzhong surrendered with his ships and men from Penghu.

Qing invasion

Orders from the Kangxi Emperor to invade Taiwan reached Yao Qisheng and Shi Lang on 6 June 1682. The invasion fleet was met with unfavorable winds and was forced to turn back. Yao proposed a five-month postponement of the invasion to wait for favorable winds in November. Conflict between Yao and Shi led to Yao's removal from power in November.

On 18 November 1682, Shi Lang was authorized to assume the role of supreme commander while Yao was relegated to logistical matters. Supplies arrived for Shi's 21,000 troops, 70 large warships, 103 supply ships, and 65 double mast vessels in early December. Spy ships were sent to scout Penghu and returned safely. Two attempts to sail to Penghu in February 1683 failed due to a shift in winds.

Shi's fleet of 238 ships and over 21,000 men set sail on 8 July 1683. Liu Guoxuan, the commander of 30,000 men at Penghu, considered the movement a false alarm and believed Shi would turn back. The next day, Shi's fleet was sighted at small islands to the northwest of Penghu. The Qing forces were met by 200 Zheng ships. Following an exchange of gunfire, the Qing were forced to retreat with two Zheng naval commanders, Qiu Hui and Jiang Sheng, in pursuit. The Qing vanguard led by Admiral Lan Li provided cover fire for a withdrawal. Shi was hit in the right eye and Lan was wounded in the stomach during the fighting. The Zheng side also suffered heavy losses, making Liu reluctant to pursue the disarrayed Qing forces. He reported a "great victory" back to Taiwan.

On 11 July, Shi regrouped his squadrons and requested reinforcements at Bazhao. On 16 July, a reinforcement of large ships arrived. Shi divided the main striking force into eight squadrons of seven ships with himself leading from the middle. Two flotillas of 50 small ships sailed in two different directions as a diversion. The remaining vessels served as rear reinforcements.

The battle took place in the bay of Magong. The Zheng garrison fired at the Qing ships and then set sail from the harbor with about 100 ships to meet the Qing forces. Shi concentrated fire on one big enemy ship at a time until all of Zheng's battle ships were sunk by the end of 17 July. Liu escaped to Taiwan with dozens of small vessels. Approximately 12,000 Zheng men perished. The garrison commanders surrendered after hearing of Liu's escape. The Qing captured Penghu on 18 July.

Surrender

General He You, the chief commander of northern Taiwan, contacted Shi Lang with the intention of surrendering. Dong Teng, the commander of a Zheng fleet, followed suit. After his defeat at Penghu, Liu Guoxuan favored surrendering and convinced the Zheng government to send a peace mission to Penghu. On 26 August 1683, the 13-year old ruler Zheng Keshuang asked Zheng Dexiao to draft a petition of surrender. The first petition was rejected for its insistence on allowing Zheng Keshuang to stay in Taiwan. The second petition of surrender, bearing terms of unconditional surrender, arrived at Penghu on 5 September.

Shi Lang's party arrived in Taiwan on 5 October 1683 to supervise the surrender. No one was executed and the surrender went smoothly. Zheng Keshuang and other leaders shaved their head in the Manchu style. Some Ming loyalists refused and chose death rather than to cut their hair but the majority accepted this change. The use of the Ming calendar, which the Zhengs had upheld for 38 years, was ended. A three-year tax exemption for all local inhabitants was proclaimed.

Qing dynasty (1683–1895)

Annexation

After the defeat of the Kingdom of Tungning at the Battle of Penghu in 1683, the 13-year old ruler Zheng Keshuang surrendered to the Qing dynasty. The Kangxi Emperor celebrated the defeat of the Ming loyalist regime in Taiwan which had pestered the Qing for decades. He composed two poems in celebration of the victory. Admiral Shi Lang, who had led Qing forces against the Zheng in naval battle, was awarded a hereditary title, the "Marquis of Sea-pacification," on 7 October 1683.

Shi Lang remained in Taiwan for 98 days before returning to Fujian on 29 December 1683. His stay in Taiwan made him feel that annexing Taiwan was of greater importance than expected due to its economic potential. At the conference in Fujian to determine Taiwan's future, some officials from the central government advocated for transporting all of Taiwan's inhabitants to the mainland and abandoning the island. Prior to 1683, Taiwan was associated with a rumored "Island of Dogs," "Island of Women," etc., which were thought, by Han literati, to lie beyond the seas. Taiwan was regarded by Kangxi as "a ball of mud beyond the pale of civilization", an image inherited from the Ming conception of the island, and did not appear on any map of the imperial domain until 1683. Their primary concern was the defeat of the rebels which had already been accomplished. One argued that defending Taiwan was impossible and increasing defense expenditures was highly unfavorable.

Shi, however, vehemently opposed abandoning Taiwan. Yao Qisheng had also been strongly in favor of annexing Taiwan. On 7 October 1683, Yao stated that though Taiwan had not been part of China, the Zhengs wreaked havoc on the mainland for 20 years after seizing it from the Dutch, and if Taiwan was relinquished then it would once again be occupied by rebels threatening the Chinese coast. Shi argued that to abandon Taiwan would leave it open to other enemies such as criminals, adventurers, and the Dutch. He assured that defending Taiwan would not be cost exorbitant and would only take 10,000 men, while garrisoned forces on the South China coast could be reduced. Shi convinced all the attendees at the Fujian conference, with the exception of the special commissioner from Beijing, Subai, that it was in their best interests to annex Taiwan. On 7 February 1684, Shi sent a memorial to Kangxi with arguments to keep Taiwan, including descriptions of Taiwan's economic products, the cost of relocating Taiwan's inhabitants, and a map of the island. Prior to the Qing dynasty, China was conceived as a land bound by mountains, rivers and seas. The idea of an island as a part of China was unfathomable prior to the Qing frontier expansion effort of the 17th century.

On 6 March 1684, Kangxi accepted Shi's proposal to set up permanent military establishments in Penghu and Taiwan. The final recommendation for annexing Taiwan was presented on 27 May. It was accepted by Kangxi, who authorized the establishment of Taiwan Prefecture, a new prefecture of Fujian Province, with three counties: Taiwan, Zhuluo, and Fengshan. Yang Wenkui was appointed chief commander of Taiwan.

Lin Qianguang's description of Taiwan

Lin Qianguang was from Changle County, Fujian Province. He held office in Taiwan Prefecture from 1687 to 1691 but lived in Taiwan for several years beforehand and wrote an account of it in 1685.

According to Lin, Taiwan was a place of outlaws. Most of the people near the prefectural capital were Changzhou and Quanzhou people and beyond there were mostly barbarians, whom he described as stubborn stupid people without family names or ancestral sacrifices. They did not have a calendar or know their own ages, had no terms for their grandparents, and practiced headhunting. The men and women wore no shoes and covered their body with a shirt and cloth for their lower body. The women wrapped their shins in blue cloth and wore flowers or grasses in their hair. Males from the age of 14 or 15 wore rattan girdles. They used fresh grass to stain their teeth black. They pierced their ears and tattooed their bodies. Some tattooed their bodies with Western writing (Dutch). They wore metal bracelets on their arms, sometimes as many as ten, used bird wings to adorn their shoulders, and hung seashells on their necks.

For local officials they had a chief and his deputies, around six or seven persons in a large village and three or four in a small village. They were divided according to their families in the common-house where matters were discussed. The youths slept outside. Some were able to write Western characters (Dutch). They were called jiaoce and handled the accounting.

Girls were preferred since a boy left the family upon marriage. Lin described similar courting rituals as Chen Di. A feast was held for fellow villagers upon marriage. Tilling was done by the wife. It was common to have multiple sexual partners even when married and there was no shame in sexual activities around children.

They did not have medicine but bathed in the river when ill. They said that Dashi (bodhisattva) would heal them by putting medicine in the water. They bathed in water even during winter. Upon death, they festooned the door and divided the belongings to the survivors. Some belongings were buried with the corpse beneath the bed. After three days, the body was taken out, liquor forced down its throat, and buried without coffin. If the family moved, the body was exhumed and reburied beneath the house.

Their houses were four or five feet high with no partitions between front and back. They were shaped long and narrow like a boat. The beams and posts were painted in various colors. They kept the floor clean of dirt. Behind the house, they planted coconut trees and bamboos in dense groves to avoid the heat. They did not have bedclothes but slept in their garments. There was no kitchen except a cooking pot with a three-legged stand on the ground. They ate gruel around the pot by scooping portions out with a coconut ladle. Rice was rolled up into lumps when eaten. They fermented rice by chewing uncooked rice into paste and then putting it into bamboo tubes. Both rice and clothing were stored in gourds.

They rode on ox-drawn carts. They crossed mountain valleys with the help of vines and crossed streams by jumping from rock to rock. Their spears were about five feet long and effective within a distance of a hundred paces. Their bows were made of bamboo and hemp. The arrows were long and sharp but unfeathered. The fields were ploughed when grass appeared in spring and after the harvest day in the fall, they said a year had passed.

Deeper in the mountains, the people "look like monkeys, less than three feet tall." When spotted, they climbed to the tops of the trees. They had crossbows. Some of them lived in holes.

Taiwan administration

The Qing initially forbade mainlanders from moving to Taiwan and sent most of the Fujianese living in Taiwan back to the mainland, after which only 30,229 remained. With 546 inhabitants in Penghu, 8,108 aborigines, and 10,000 troops, the official population of Taiwan was only 50,000. The shortage of manpower compelled local officials to solicit migrants from the mainland despite restrictions imposed by the central court. Sometimes even warships transported civilians to Taiwan. By 1711, illegal migrants from Fujian and Guangdong amounted to tens of thousands yearly.

The first recorded regulation on the permit system was made in 1712 but it probably existed as early as the formal annexation in 1684. The permit system existed to reduce population pressure on Taiwan. The government believed that Taiwan was unable to support too large a population before it lead to conflict. Regulations banned migrants from bringing their families to Taiwan so that settlers would not take root in Taiwan. Another consideration was the migration of unruly people to Taiwan. To prevent undesirables from entering Taiwan, the government recommended only allowing those who had property in mainland China or relatives in Taiwan to enter Taiwan. A regulation to this effect was implemented in 1730 and in 1751 the regulation was reiterated in slightly different terms.

Over the 18th century, regulations on migration remained largely consistent with minor alterations. Early regulations centered on the good character of permit receivers while later regulations reiterated measures such as patrolling and punishment. The only changes were to the status of migrant families. Families in particular were barred from entering Taiwan to ensure that migrants would return to their families and ancestral graves. The overwhelmingly male migrants had few prospects in war-weary Fujian and thus married locally, resulting in the idiom "has Tangshan father, no Tangshan mother". Marrying aboriginal women was prohibited in 1737 on the grounds that it interfered in aboriginal life and was used by settlers as a means to claim aboriginal land.

In 1732, the governor of Guangdong petitioned to allow families to cross to Taiwan, and for the first time migrant families were allowed to legally enter Taiwan for a period between 1732 and 1740. In 1739, opposition to family migrations claimed that vagrants and undesirables were taking advantage of the system. Families were barred again from 1740 to 1746. In 1760, family crossings to Taiwan became legal again for a short period. Starting in 1771, Qing restrictions on cross-strait migration began to relax as they realized that the policies were unenforceable. Even during periods of legal migration, many more individuals chose to hire illegal ferry service rather than to deal with official procedures. After lifting restrictions on family crossings in 1760, only 48 families, or 277 people, requested permits after a year. The vast majority of them were government employee families. In comparison, within a ten-month period in 1758–1759, nearly 60,000 people were arrested for illegal crossings. In 1790, an office was set up to manage civilian travel between Taiwan and the mainland, and the Qing government ceased to actively interfere in cross-strait migration. Policy against secret crossings were briefly revived in 1834 and 1838. In 1875, all restrictions on entering Taiwan were repealed.

Settler expansion (1684-1795)

During the reigns of the Kangxi (r. 1661–1722), Yongzheng (r. 1722–1735), and Qianlong (r. 1735–1796) emperors, the Qing court deliberately restricted the expansion of territory and government administration in Taiwan. The purpose of attacking the Zhengs in Taiwan was to eliminate the enemy Ming remnant regime and the annexation of Taiwan was primarily for security reasons. Taiwan was garrisoned with 8,000 soldiers at key ports and civil administration was kept to a minimum with few changes from the previous Zheng administration. Three prefectures nominally covered the entire western plains - Taiwan, Fengshan, and Zhuluo - but effective administration covered a smaller area. A government permit was required for settlers to go beyond the Dajia River at the mid-point of the western plains. In 1715, the governor-general of Fujian-Zhejiang recommended land reclamation in Taiwan but Kangxi was worried that this would cause instability and conflicts.

Under the reign of Yongzheng, the Qing extended control over the entire western plains, but this was to better control the settlers and maintain security. The quarantine policies were maintained. In 1723, Zhuluo County was split to form a new county, Changhua, which resided north of the mid-point of the western plains. In 1731, a Tamsui subprefecture was created in the north, effectively extending government control from the southwest to the north. This was not an active colonization policy but a reflection of continued illegal crossings and land reclamation in the north. In 1717, the Zhuluo County magistrate argued that the area was too large to be effectively controlled, leading to disorder and lawlessness, and needed to be divided. The government finally reacted after a major settler rebellion, the Zhu Yigui uprising, occurred in 1721, and Zhuluo County was created in 1723. Lan Dingyuan, an advisor to Lan Tingzhen, who led forces against the rebellion, advocated for expansion and land reclamation to strengthen government control over the Chinese settlers. He wanted to convert the aborigines to Han culture and turn them into subjects of the Qing.

Under the reign of Qianlong, the administrative structure of Taiwan remained largely unchanged. In 1744, officials recommended letting settlers reclaim land but Qianlong dismissed their recommendations. This started to change after the Lin Shuangwen rebellion in 1786, after which Qianlong agreed that leaving fertile lands to unproductive aborigines only attracted illegal settlers. He came to believe that Taiwan was the "important coastal frontier territory" and "the important fence line of the five [coastal] provinces."

The Qing did little to administer the aborigines and rarely tried to subjugate or impose cultural change upon them. Aborigines were classified into two general categories: acculturated aborigines (shufan) and non-acculturated aborigines (shengfan). Sheng is a word used to describe uncooked food, unworked land, unripened-fruit, unskilled labor or strangers, while shu bears the opposite meaning. To the Qing, shufan were aborigines who paid taxes, performed corvée, and had adopted Han Chinese culture to some degree. When the Qing annexed Taiwan, there were 46 aboriginal villages under government control: 12 in Fengshan and 34 in Zhuluo. These were likely inherited from the Zheng regime. In the Yongzheng period, 108 aboriginal villages submitted as a result of encouragement and enticement from the Taiwan regional commander, Lin Liang. Shengfan who paid taxes but did not perform corvée and did not practice Han Chinese culture were called guihua shengfan (submitted non-acculturated aborigines).

The Qianlong administration forbade enticing aborigines to submit due to fear of conflict. In the early Qianlong period, there were 299 named aboriginal villages. Records show 93 shufan villages and 61 guihua shengfan villages. The number of shufan villages remained stable throughout the Qianlong period. Two aboriginal affairs sub-prefects were appointed to manage aboriginal affairs in 1766. One was in charge of the north and the other in charge of the south, both focused on the plains aborigines. Boundaries were built to keep the mountain aborigines out of settlement areas. The policy of marking settler boundaries and segregating them from aboriginal territories became official policy in 1722 in response to the Zhu Yigui uprising. Fifty-four stelae were used to mark crucial points along the settler-aboriginal boundary. Han settlers were forbidden from crossing into aboriginal territory but settler encroachment continued, and the boundaries were rebuilt in 1750, 1760, 1784, and 1790. Settlers were forbidden from marrying aborigines as marriage was one way settlers obtained land. While the settlers drove colonization and acculturation, the Qing policy of quarantine dented the impact on aborigines, especially mountain aborigines.

Administrative expansion (1796-1874)

Qing quarantine policies were maintained in the early 19th century but attitudes towards aboriginal territories started to change. Local officials repeatedly advocated for the colonization of aboriginal territories, especially in the cases of Gamalan and Shuishalian. The Gamalan or Kavalan people were situated in modern Yilan County in northeastern Taiwan. It was separated from the western plains and Tamsui (Danshui) by mountains. There were 36 aboriginal villages in the area and the Kavalan people had started paying taxes as early as the Kangxi period (r. 1661–1722), but they were non-acculturated guihua shengfan aborigines.

In 1787, a Chinese settler named Wu Sha tried to reclaim land in Gamalan but was defeated by aborigines. The next year, the Tamsui sub-prefect convinced the Taiwan prefect, Yang Tingli, to support Wu Sha. Yang recommended subjugating the natives and opening Gamalan for settlement to the Fujian governor but the governor refused to act due to fear of conflict. In 1797, a new Tamsui sub-prefect issued permit and financial support for Wu to recruit settlers for land reclamation, which was illegal. Wu's successors were unable to register the reclaimed land on government registers. Local officials supported land reclamation but could not officially recognize it.

In 1806 it was reported that a pirate, Cai Qian, was within the vicinity of Gamalan. Taiwan Prefect Yang once again recommended opening up Gamalan, arguing that to abandon it would cause trouble on the frontier. Later another pirate band tried to occupy Gamalan. Yang recommended to the Fuzhou General Saichong'a the establishment of administration and land surveys in Gamalan. Saichong'a initially refused but then changed his mind and sent a memorial to the emperor in 1808 recommending the incorporation of Gamalan. The issue was discussed by the central government officials and for the first time, one official went on record saying that if aboriginal territory was incorporated, not only would it end the pirate threat but the government would stand to profit from the land itself. In 1809, the emperor ordered for Gamalan to be incorporated. The next year an imperial decree for the formal incorporation of Gamalan was issued and a Gamalan sub-prefect was appointed.

Unlike Gamalan, debates on Shuishalian resulted in its continued status as a closed-off area. Shuishalian refers to the upstream areas of the Zhuoshui River and Wu River in central Taiwan. The inner mountain area of Shuishalian was inhabited by 24 aboriginal villages and six of them occupied the flat and fertile basin area. The aboriginals had submitted as early as 1693 but they remained non-acculturated. In 1814, some settlers were able to obtain reclamation permits through fabricating aboriginal land lease requests. In 1816, the government sent troops to evict the settlers and destroy their strongholds. Stelae were erected demarcating the land forbidden to Chinese settlers.

In 1823, the aboriginal affairs sub-prefect for the north, Deng Chuan'an, recommended opening up inner Shuishalian. The Gamalan sub-prefect, Yao Ying, discouraged this, stating that the administrative costs were too high and the aborigines uncooperative. In 1841 the issue was brought up again, but this time it was recommended that all of Taiwan be opened up. The Daoguang Emperor ordered the Fujian-Zhejiang governor-general to investigate reclaiming land in Taiwan to increase revenue for the maritime defense. The plan was shelved after the cost was deemed too high. In 1846, a new Fujian-Zhejiang governor-general, Liu Yunke, argued that opening up inner Shuishalian would be beneficial. The central government officials were unconvinced. Liu visited Shuishalian and detailed a report on the aborigines and their land with the purpose of encouraging the central court to open up the land for settlement. Still the central court refused to open up the area. In 1848, a Taiwan circuit intendant recommended letting Shuishalian aborigines lease their land to settlers. This suggestion was ignored. The subject of land reclamation continued to be a topic of discussion and the Tamsui subprefecture gazetteer in 1871 openly called for "opening the mountains and subjugating the aborigines."

Expansion in reaction to crises (1875-1895)

In 1874, Japan invaded aboriginal territory in southern Taiwan in what is known as the Mudan Incident (Japanese invasion of Taiwan (1874)). For six months Japanese soldiers occupied southern Taiwan and Japan argued that it was not part of the Qing dynasty. The result was the payment of an indemnity by the Qing in return for the Japanese army's withdrawal.

The imperial commissioner for Taiwan, Shen Baozhen, argued that "the reason that Taiwan is being coveted by [Japan] is that the land is too empty." He recommended subjugating the aborigines and populating their territory with Chinese settlers. As a result, the administration of Taiwan was expanded and campaigns against the aborigines were launched. A new prefecture, Taipeh Prefecture, was created. Gamalan subprefecture became Yilan County. Tamsui subprefecture was divided into Tamsui and Hsinchu. A new county, Hengchun, was created in the south. The two sub-prefects responsible for aboriginal affairs were moved to inner Shushalian (Puli) and eastern Taiwan (Beinan), the focal points for colonization. Starting in 1874, mountain roads were built to make the region more accessible and aborigines were brought into formal submission to the Qing. In 1875, the ban on entering Taiwan was lifted. In 1877, 21 guidelines on subjugating aborigines and opening the mountains were issued. Agencies for recruiting settlers were established on the coastal mainland and in Hong Kong. However efforts to promote settlement in Taiwan petered out soon after.

The Sino-French War broke on in 1883 and the French occupied Keelung in northern Taiwan in 1884. The French army withdrew in 1885. Efforts to settle in aboriginal territories were renewed under the governance of Liu Mingchuan, the Fujian governor and Taiwan defense commissioner. Administering Taiwan became his sole focus in 1885 and the administration of Fujian was left to the governor-general. Another prefecture, Taiwan Prefecture, was created in the western plains, while the former Taiwan Prefecture was renamed Tainan. Three new counties, Taiwan, Yunlin, and Miaoli, were created by dividing the existing administrative units. Eastern Taiwan, the Beinan subprefecture, was governed by a new Taitung Department (eastern Taiwan department). In the subsequent years, the subprefectures of Puli, Keelung, and Nanya were added. In 1887, Taiwan became its own province. For five years, Fujian provided Taiwan with a yearly transition subsidy of 400,000 taels, or 10 percent of Taiwan's annual revenue. During Liu's tenure, Taiwan's capital was shifted from Tainan to modern Taichung. Taipei was built up as a temporary capital and then became the permanent capital in 1893. Liu's efforts to increase revenues sugar, camphor, and imports were mixed due to foreign pressure to reduce levies. Revenues from coal mines and steamship lines became a primary part of Taiwan's annual budget. A cadastral reform survey was undertaken from June 1886 to January 1890 that met with opposition in the south. The receipts from the land tax reform constituted a sizable gain, however they fell short of expectations.

Under Liu's governance, a number of technological innovations were introduced to Taiwan, including electric lighting, modern weaponry, a railway, cable and telegraph lines, a local steamship service, and machinery for lumbering, sugar refining, and brick making. A telegraph line from Tainan to Tamsui was constructed in 1886-88 and a railway connecting Keelung, Taipei, and Hsinchu was built. These first efforts were met with mixed results. The telegraph line could only function in bursts of a week due to a difficult overland connection and the railway required an overhaul, serviced small rolling stock, and carried little freight. Taiwan was not a very attractive place for laborers, most of whom wanted to go to Southeast Asia. Few settlers went to Taiwan and those that did were accosted by aborigines and the harsh climate. Governor Liu was criticized for the high cost and little gain from the colonization activities. Liu resigned in 1891 and the colonization efforts ceased with much of the reclaimed land going to waste.

A Taiwan Pacification and Reclamation Head Office was established with eight pacification and reclamation bureaus. Four bureaus were located in eastern Taiwan, two in Puli (inner Shuishalian), one in the north, and one on the western border of the mountains. By 1887, about 500 aboriginal villages, or roughly 90,000 aborigines had formally submitted to Qing rule. This number increased to 800 villages with 148,479 aborigines over the following years. However the cost of getting them to submit was exorbitant. The Qing offered them materials and paid village chiefs monthly allowances. Not all the aborigines were under effective control and land reclamation in eastern Taiwan occurred at a slow pace. From 1884 to 1891, Liu launched more than 40 military campaigns against the aborigines with 17,500 soldiers. A third of the invasion force was killed or disabled in the conflict, amounting to a costly failure.

By the end of the Qing period, the western plains were fully developed as farmland with about 2.5 million Chinese settlers. The mountainous areas were still largely autonomous under the control of aborigines. Aboriginal land loss under the Qing occurred at a relatively slow pace compared to the following Japanese colonial period due to the absence of state sponsored land deprivation for the majority of Qing rule. In the 50-year period of Japanese rule that followed, the Taiwanese aborigines lost their right to legal ownership of land and were confined to small reserves one-eighth the size of their ancestral lands. However even had Japan not taken over Taiwan, the plains aborigines were on the way to losing their residual rights to land. By the last years of Qing rule, most of the plains aborigines had been acculturated to Han culture, around 20-30% could speak their mother tongues, and gradually lost their land ownership and rent collection rights.

Rebellions

Aboriginal
In 1723, aborigines living in Dajiaxi village along the central coastal plain rebelled. Government troops from southern Taiwan were sent to put down this revolt, but in their absence, Han settlers in Fengshan County rose up in revolt under the leadership of Wu Fusheng, a settler from Zhangzhou. By 1732, five different ethnic groups were in revolt but the rebellion was defeated by the end of the year.

During the Qianlong period (1735-1796), the 93 shufan acculturated aborigine villages never rebelled and over 200 non-acculturated aboriginal villages submitted. In fact, during the 200 years of Qing rule in Taiwan, the plains aborigines rarely rebelled against the government and the mountain aborigines were left to their own devices until the last 20 years of Qing rule. Most of the rebellions were caused by Han settlers.

Zhu Yigui
Zhu Yigui, also known as the "Duck King", was a settler from Fujian. He became the owner of a duck farm in Taiwan's Luohanmen (modern Kaohsiung). Zhu was known among locals for his generous conduct and persistent fight against immoral conduct. In 1720, there was an upset among merchants, fishermen, and farmers in Taiwan due to increased taxation. They gathered around Zhu, who shared the same surname with the Ming dynasty's royal family, and supported him in mobilizing discontent Chinese into an anti-Qing rebellion. Zhu was declared the Ming Emperor and efforts were made to imitate Ming style clothing with performance costumes. Hakka leader Lin Junying from the south also joined the rebellion. In March 1720, Zhu and Lin attacked the Qing garrison at Taiwan County and defeated them in April. In less than two weeks, the rebels had defeated Qing forces in all of Taiwan. The Hakka troops left Zhu to follow Lin north. The Qing sent a fleet under the command of Shi Shibian (son of Shi Lang) with an army of 22,000 troops. A month later, the rebellion was defeated and Zhu was executed in Beijing.

Lin Shuangwen

In 1786, members of the Tiandihui (Heaven and Earth society) secret society were arrested for failing to make tax payments. The Tiandihui broke into the jail, killed the guards, and rescued their members. When Qing troops were sent into the village and tried to arrest Lin Shuangwen, the leader of the Tiandihui and a settler from Fujian, led his forces to defeat the Qing troops. Many of the rebel army's troops came from new arrivals from mainland China who could not find land to farm. They joined the Tiandihui for protection. Lin attacked Changhua County, killing 2,000 civilians. In early 1787, 50,000 Qing troops under Li Shiyao from the mainland were sent to put down the rebellion. The two sides fought to a stalemate for six months. Lin tried to enlist the support of the Hakka people but not only did they refuse, they sent their troops to support the Qing. Despite the Tiandihui's ostensibly anti-Qing stance, its members were generally anti-government and were not motivated by ethnic or national interest, resulting in social discord and political chaos. Some civilians aided the Qing against the rebels. In 1788, a fresh force of 10,000 Qing troops led by Fuk'anggan and Hailanqa were sent to Taiwan. They successfully defeated the rebellion shortly after arriving. Lin was executed in Beijing in April 1788. The Qianlong Emperor gave Zhuluo County its modern name Chiayi (lit. commendable righteousness) for resisting the rebels.

Invasions

Maurice Benyovszky

Maurice Benyovszky (born in the Kingdom of Hungary) is possibly the first European to land on Taiwan's east coast, but it is uncertain whether the events surrounding his landing actually occurred. According to a 1790 English translation of the Memoirs and Travels of Mauritius Augustus Count de [Benovsky], an eighteen-person party landed on Taiwan's eastern shores in 1771. They met a few people and asked them for food. They were taken to a village and fed rice, pork, lemons, and oranges. They were offered a few knives. While making their way back to the ship, they were hit by arrows. The party fired back and killed six attackers. Near their ship, they were ambushed again by 60 warriors. They defeated their attackers and captured five of them. Benyovszky wanted to leave but his associates insisted on staying. A larger landing party rowed ashore a day later and were met by 50 unarmed locals. The party headed to the village and slaughtered 200 locals while eleven of the party members were injured. They then left and headed north with the guidance of locals.

Upon reaching a "beautiful harbor" they met Don Hieronemo Pacheco, a Spaniard who had been living among the aborigines for seven to eight years. The locals were grateful toward Benyovszky for killing the villagers, who they considered their enemies. Paheco told Benyovszky that the western side of the island was ruled by the Chinese but the rest was independent or inhabited by aborigines. Paheco told Benyovszky that it would take very little to conquer the island and drive out the Chinese. On the third day, Benyovszky was calling the harbor "Port Maurice" after himself. Conflict broke out again as the party was fetching fresh water and three members were killed. The party executed their remaining prisoners and slaughtered a boatful of the enemies. By the end, they had killed 1,156 and captured 60 aborigines. They were visited by a prince named Huapo who believed Benyovszky was prophesied to free them from the "Chinese yoke." With Benyovszky's arms, Huapo then defeated his Chinese aligned foes. Huapo gifted Benyovszky's crew with gold and other valuables to try to get them to stay but Benyovszky wanted to go so that he could see his wife and son.

There are reasons to suspect this account of events is either exaggerated or fabricated. Benyovszky's exploits have been questioned by several experts over the years. Ian Inkster's "Orientat Enlightenment: The Problematic Military Claims of Count Maurice Auguste Conte de Benyowsky in Formosa during 1771" criticizes the Taiwan section specifically. The population of Taiwan given by Benyovszky's account is inconsistent with estimates of that time. The stretch of coast he visited likely only had 6,000 to 10,000 inhabitants but somehow the prince was able to gather 25,000 warriors to fight 12,000 enemies. Even in Father de Mailla's account of Taiwan in 1715, in which he portrayed the Chinese in a very negative manner, and spoke of the entire east being in rebellion against the west, the aborigines were still unable to put up a fighting force of more than 30 or 40 armed with arrows and javelins. Huaco was also mentioned to have nearly 100 horsemen while having 68 to spare for the European party's use. Horses were introduced to Taiwan starting in the Dutch period but it is highly unlikely that aborigines of the northeast coast had acquired so many that they could train them for large scale warfare. In other 18th century accounts, it was mentioned that horses were in such scarce supply that Chinese oxen were used as substitutes.

Opium War
By 1831, the East India Company decided it no longer wanted to trade with the Chinese on their terms and planned more aggressive measures. A Prussian missionary and linguist, Karl F.A. Gutzlaff, was sent to explore Taiwan. He published his experiences in Taiwan in 1833 confirming its rich resources and trade potential. Given the strategic and commercial value of Taiwan, there were British suggestions in 1840 and 1841 to seize the island. William Huttman wrote to Lord Palmerston pointing out "China's benign rule over Taiwan and the strategic and commercial importance of the island." He suggested that Taiwan could be occupied with only a warship and less than 1,500 troops, and the English would be able to spread Christianity among the natives as well as develop trade.

In 1841, during the First Opium War, the British tried to scale the heights around the harbor of Keelung three times but failed. The British transport ship Nerbudda became shipwrecked near Keelung Harbour due to a typhoon. The captain and a handful of English officers escaped safely, however most of the crew including 29 Europeans, 5 Filipinos, and 240 Indian lascars, were rescued by locals and handed over to Qing officials in Tainan, the capital of Taiwan. In October 1841, HMS Nimrod sailed to Keelung to search for the Nerbudda survivors, but after Captain Joseph Pearse found out that they were sent south for imprisonment, he ordered the bombardment of the harbour and destroyed 27 sets of cannon before returning to Hong Kong. The brig Ann also shipwrecked in March 1842 and another 54 survivors were taken. The commanders of Taiwan, Dahonga and Yao Ying, filed a disingenuous report to the emperor, claiming to have defended against an attack from the Keelung fort. Most of the survivors—over 130 from the Nerbudda and 54 from the Ann—were executed in Tainan in August 1842. The false report was later discovered and the officials in Taiwan punished. The British wanted them executed but they were only given different postings on the mainland, which the British were not aware of until 1845.

Rover incident

On 12 March 1867, the American barque Rover shipwrecked offshore at the southern tip of Taiwan. The vessel sank but the captain, his wife, and some men escaped on two boats. One boat landed at a small bay near the Bi Mountains inhabited by the Koaluts (Guizaijiao) tribe of the Paiwan people. The Koaluts aborigines captured them and mistook the captain's wife for a man. They killed her. The captain, two white men, and the Chinese sailors save for one who managed to escape to Takau, were also killed. The Cormorant, a British steamer, tried to help and landed near the shipwreck on 26 March. The aborigines fired muskets and shot arrows at them, forcing them to retreat. The American Asiatic Fleet's Admiral Bell also landed at the Bi Mountains where they got lost, suffered heatstroke, and then was ambushed by the aborigines, losing an officer.

Le Gendre, the US Consul, blamed the Qing dynasty for the failure and demanded that they send troops to help him negotiate with the aborigines. He also hoped that the Qing would permanently station troops to prevent further killings by the aborigines. On 10 September, Garrison Commander Liu Mingcheng led 500 Qing troops to southern Taiwan with Le Gendre. The remains were recovered. The aboriginal chief, Tanketok (Toketok), explained that a long time ago the white men came and almost exterminated the Koaluts tribe and their ancestors passed down their desire for revenge. They came to an oral agreement that the mountain aborigines would not kill any more castaways, would care for them and hand them over to the Chinese at Langqiao.

Le Gendre visited the tribe again in February 1869 and signed an agreement with them in English. It was later discovered that Tanketok did not have absolute control over the tribes and some of them paid him no heed. Le Gendre castigated China as a semi-civilized power for not fulfilling the obligation of the law of nations, which is to seize the territory of a "wild race" and to confer upon it the benefits of civilization. Since China failed to prevent the aborigines from killing subjects or citizens of civilized countries, "we see the rights of the Emperor of China over aboriginal Formosa, such as we have said, are not absolute, as long as she remains uncivilized..." Le Gendre later moved to Japan and worked with the Japanese government as a foreign advisor on their China policy, including the development of the concept of the "East Asian crescent". According to the "East Asian crescent" concept, Japan should control Korea, Taiwan, and Ryukyu to affirm its position in East Asia.

Mudan incident

In December 1871, a Ryukyuan vessel shipwrecked on the southeastern tip of Taiwan and 54 sailors were killed by aborigines. Four tribute ships were returning to the Ryukyu Islands when they were blown off course on 12 December. Two ships were pushed towards Taiwan. One of them landed on Taiwan's western coast and made it back home with the help of Qing officials. The other one crashed into the eastern coast of southern Taiwan near Bayao Bay. There were 69 passengers and 66 managed to make it to shore. They met two Chinese men who told them not to travel inland where the dangerous Paiwan people were.

According to the survivors, the Chinese robbed them and they decided to part ways. On 18 December they headed westward and encountered aboriginal men, presumably Paiwanese. They followed the Paiwanese to a small settlement, Kuskus, where they were given food and water. According to Kuskus local Valjeluk Mavalu, the water was a symbol of protection and friendship. The deposition claims they were robbed by their Kuskus hosts during the night. In the morning they were ordered to stay put while hunters left to search for game to provide a feast. Alarmed by the armed men and rumors of head hunting, the Ryukyuans departed while the hunting party was away. They found shelter in the home of a 73 year old Hakka trading-post serviceman, Deng Tianbao. The Paiwanese men found the Ryukyuans and dragged them out, slaughtering them, while others died in a fight or were caught trying to escape. Nine Ryukyuans hid in Deng's home. They moved to another Hakka settlement Poliac (Baoli) where they found refuge with Deng's son-in-law, Yang Youwang. Yang arranged for the ransom of three men and sheltered the survivors for 40 days before sending them to Taiwan Prefecture (modern Tainan). The Ryukuans headed home in July 1872.

It is uncertain what caused the Paiwanese to murder the Ryukyuans. Some say the Ryukyuans did not understand Paiwanese guest etiquette, they ate and ran, or that their captors could not find ransom and therefore killed them. According to Lianes Punanang, a Mudan local, 66 men who could not understand the local languages entered Kuskus and began taking food and drink, disregarding village boundaries. Efforts to aid the strangers with food and drink strained Kuskus resources. They were finally killed for their misdeeds. The shipwreck and murder of the sailors came to be known as the Mudan incident although it did not take place in Mudan (J. Botan), but at Kuskus (Gaoshifo).

The Mudan incident did not immediately cause any concern in Japan. A few officials knew of it by mid-1872 but it was not until April 1874 that it became an international concern. The repatriation procedure in 1872 was by the books and had been a regular affair for several centuries. From the 17th to 19th centuries, the Qing had settled 401 Ryukyuan shipwreck incidents both on the coast of mainland China and Taiwan. The Ryukyu Kingdom did not ask Japanese officials for help regarding the shipwreck. Instead its king, Shō Tai, sent a reward to Chinese officials in Fuzhou for the return of the 12 survivors.

Japanese expedition

On 30 August 1872, Sukenori Kabayama, a general of the Imperial Japanese Army, urged the Japanese government to invade Taiwan's tribal areas. In September, Japan dethroned the king of Ryukyu. On 9 October, Kabayama was ordered to conduct a survey in Taiwan. In 1873, Tanemomi Soejima was sent to communicate to the Qing court that if it did not extend its rule to the entirety of Taiwan, punish murderers, pay victims' families' compensation, and refused to talk about the matter, Japan would take care of the matter. The Foreign Minister Sakimitsu Yanagihara believed that the perpetrators of the Mudan incident were "all Taiwan savages beyond Chinese education and law." Japan justified sending an expedition to Taiwan through linguistic interpretation of "化外之民" to mean not part of China. Chinese diplomat Li Hongzhang rejected the claim that the murder of Ryukyuans had anything to do with Japan once he learned of Japan's aspirations. However, after communications between the Qing and Yanagihara, the Japanese took their explanation to mean that the Qing government had not opposed Japan's claims to sovereignty over the Ryukyu Islands, disclaimed any jurisdiction over Aboriginal Taiwanese, and had indeed consented to Japan's expedition to Taiwan. In the eyes of Japan and the foreign advisor Le Gendre, the aborigines were "savages" who had no sovereign or international status, and therefore their territory was "terra nullius", free to be seized for Japan. The Qing argued that like in many other countries, the administration of the government did not stretch to every part of a country, similar to the Indian territories in the United States or aboriginal territories in Australia and New Zealand, a view Le Gendre also took before his employment by the Japanese.

Japan had already sent a student, Kurooka Yunojo, to conduct surveys in Taiwan in April 1873. Kabayama reached Tamsui on 23 August disguised as a merchant and surveyed eastern Taiwan. On 9 March 1874, the Taiwan Expedition prepared for its mission. The magistrate of the Taiwan Circuit learned of the impending Japanese invasion from a Hong Kong newspaper quoting a Japanese news item and reported it to Fujian authorities. Qing officials were taken by complete surprise due to the seemingly cordial relations with Japan at the time. On 17 May, Saigō Jūdō led the main force, 3,600 strong, aboard four warships in Nagasaki head to Tainan. On 6 June, the Japanese emperor issued a certificate condemning the Taiwan "savages" for killing our "nationals", the Ryukyuans killed in southeastern Taiwan.

On 3 May 1874, Kusei Fukushima delivered a note to Fujian-Zhejiang Governor Li Henian announcing that they were heading to savage territory to punish the culprits. On 7 May, a Chinese translator, Zhan Hansheng, was sent ashore to establish peaceful relations with tribes other than the Mudan and Kuskus. Afterwards American foreign officers and Fukushima landed at Checheng and Xinjie. They tried to use Baxian Bay at Qinggangpu as their barracks but heavy rain flooded the site a few days later so the Japanese moved to the southern end of Langqiao Bay on 11 May. They learned that Tanketok had died and invited the Shemali tribe for talks. Japanese scouts fanned out and were met by attacks by aborigines. On 21 May, a 12-member scout party was ambushed and two were wounded. The Japanese camp sent 250 reinforcements and searched the villages. The next day, Samata Sakuma encountered Mudan fighters, around 70 strong, occupying a commanding height. A twenty-men party climbed the cliffs and shot at the Mudan people, forcing them to flee. The Mudan lost 16 men including their tribal leader, Agulu. The Japanese lost seven with 30 injured.

The Japanese army split into three forces and headed in different directions, the south, north, and central routes. The south route army was ambushed by the Kuskus tribe and lost three soldiers. A counterattack defeated the Kuskus fighter and the Japanese burnt their villages. The central route was attacked by Mudan and two or three soldiers were wounded. The Japanese burnt their villages. The north route attacked the Nünai village. On 3 June, they burnt all the villages that had been occupied. On 1 July, the new leader of the Mudan tribe and the chief of Kuskus admitted defeat and promised not to harm shipwrecked castaways. Surrendered aborigines were given Japanese flags to fly over their villages. They were viewed as a symbol of peace with Japan and protection from rival tribes by the aborigines. To the Japanese, it was a symbol of jurisdiction over the aborigines. Chinese forces arrived on 17 June and a report by Fujian Administration Commissioner reported that all 56 representatives of the tribes except for Mudan, Zhongshe and Linai, who were not present due to fleeing from the Japanese, complained about Japanese bullying.

A Chinese representative, Pan Wei, met with Saigō four times between 22 and 26 June but nothing came of it. The Japanese settled in and established large camps with no intention of withdrawing, but in August and September 600 soldiers fell ill. They started dying 15 a day. The death toll rose to 561. Toshimichi Okubo arrived in Beijing on 10 September and seven negotiating sessions occurred over a month long period. The Western Powers pressured China not to cause bloodshed with Japan as it would negatively impact the coastal trade. The resulting Peking Agreement was signed on 30 October. Japan gained the recognition of Ryukyu as its vassal and an indemnity payment of 500,000 taels. Japanese troops withdrew from Taiwan on 3 December.

Sino-French War

During the Sino-French War, the French invaded Taiwan during the Keelung Campaign in 1884. The Chinese had already been aware of French plans to attack Taiwan and sent Liu Mingchuan, the governor of Fujian, to strengthen Taiwan's defenses on 16 July. On 5 August 1884, Sébastien Lespès bombarded Keelung's harbor and destroyed the gun placements. The next day, the French attempted to take Keelung but failed to defeat the larger Chinese force led by Liu Mingchuan and were forced to withdraw to their ships. On 1 October, Amédée Courbet landed with 2,250 French forces and defeated a smaller Chinese force, though equipped with Krupp guns, capturing Keelung. French efforts to capture Tamsui failed. The port of Tamsui had been filled with debris by the Chinese and the French were unable to sustain a landing. The French shelled Tamsui, destroying not only the forts but also foreign buildings. Some 800 French troops landed on Shalin beach near Tamsui but they were repelled by Chinese forces.

The French imposed a blockade Taiwan from 23 October 1884 until April 1885 but the execution was not completely effective. Foreign vessels were barred from docking in blockaded harbors. Some believed that the blockade was almost directed at the British. The French did not have enough ships to impose a complete blockade on Taiwan and only concentrated on the major ports, leaving smaller Chinese vessels to enter lesser ports with troops and supplies. The first Chinese relief effort, a fleet of five ships, was repelled by the French with two ships sunk. On 21 December 1884, five battalions in southern China were ordered to reinforce Taiwan. French ships around mainland China's coast attacked any junk they could find and captured its occupants to be shipped to Keelung for constructing defensive works. However the blockade failed to stop Chinese junks from reaching Taiwan. For every junk the French captured, another five junks arrived with supplies at Takau and Anping. The immediate effect of the blockade was a sharp in decline of legal trade and income.

In late January 1885, Chinese forces suffered a serious defeat around Keelung. Although the French captured Keelung they were unable to move beyond its perimeters. In March the French tried to take Tamsui again and failed. At sea, the French bombarded Penghu on 28 March. Penghu surrendered on 31 March but many of the French soon grew ill and 1,100 soldiers and later 600 more were debilitated. The French commander died from illness in Penghu.

An agreement was reached on 15 April 1885 and an end to hostilities was announced. The French evacuation from Keelung was completed on 21 June 1885 and Penghu remained under Chinese control.

First Sino-Japanese War

On the eve of the First Sino-Japanese War, about 45 percent of the island was administered under direct Qing administration while the remaining was lightly populated by Aborigines. In a population of around 2.5 million, about 2.3 million were Han Chinese and the remaining two hundred thousand were classified as members of various indigenous tribes.

End of Qing rule
As part of the settlement for losing the Sino-Japanese War, the Qing empire ceded the islands of Taiwan and Penghu to Japan on April 17, 1895, according to the terms of the Treaty of Shimonoseki. The loss of Taiwan would become a rallying point for the Chinese nationalist movement in the years that followed.

Japanese Empire (1895–1945)

The acquisition of Taiwan by Japan was the result of Prime Minister Itō Hirobumi's "southern strategy" adopted during the First Sino-Japanese War in 1894–95 and the following diplomacy in the spring of 1895. Itō and Mutsu Munemitsu, the minister of foreign affairs, stipulated that Penghu and Taiwan must be ceded by Qing China to Japan. These conditions and other Japanese demands were met during the signing of the Treaty of Shimonoseki on 17 April 1895. Taiwan and Penghu were formally transferred to Japan on 2 June. Kabayama Sukenori was appointed governor-general of Taiwan.

The period of Japanese rule in Taiwan has been divided into three periods under which different policies were prevalent: military suppression (1895–1915), : assimilation (1915–37), and : Japanization (1937–45). A separate policy for aborigines was implemented.

Assimilation policies
The matter of assimilation, was a primary issue in Taiwan under Japanese rule. Assimilation was tied to the admonition "impartiality and equal favor" (isshi dōjin) for all imperial subjects under the Japanese Emperor. Conceptually this colonial ideal conveyed the idea that metropolitan Japanese (naichijin) would impart their superior culture to the subordinate islanders (hontōjin), who would share the common benefits of "civilization and enlightenment". Assimilation seemed plausible to educated elites in Japan because it was common belief that Han Taiwanese shared cultural and racial similarities with the Japanese.

Armed Resistance

While the government deliberated on assimilation policies in Tokyo, the colonial authorities encountered violent opposition in much of Taiwan. Five months of sustained warfare occurred after the invasion of Taiwan in 1895 and partisan attacks continued until 1902. For the first two years the colonial authority relied mainly on military force and local pacification efforts. Disorder and panic were prevalent in Taiwan after Penghu was seized by Japan in March 1895. On 20 May, Qing officials were ordered to leave their posts. General mayhem and destruction ensued in the following months.

Japanese forces landed on the coast of Keelung on 29 May and Tamsui's harbor was bombarded. Remnant Qing units and Guangdong irregulars briefly fought against Japanese forces in the north. After the fall of Taipei on 7 June, local militia and partisan bands continued the resistance. In the south, a small Black Flag force led by Liu Yongfu delayed Japanese landings. Governor Tang Jingsong attempted to carry out anti-Japanese resistance efforts as the Republic of Formosa, however he still professed to be a Qing loyalist. The declaration of a republic was, according to Tang, to delay the Japanese so that Western powers might be compelled to defend Taiwan. The plan quickly turned to chaos as the Green Standard Army and Yue soldiers from Guangxi took to looting and pillaging Taiwan. Given the choice between chaos at the hands of bandits or submission to the Japanese, Taipei's gentry elite sent Koo Hsien-jung to Keelung to invite the advancing Japanese forces to proceed to Taipei and restore order. The Republic, established on 25 May, disappeared 12 days later when its leaders left for the mainland. Liu Yongfu formed a temporary government in Tainan but escaped to the mainland as well as Japanese forces closed in. Between 200,000 and 300,000 people fled Taiwan in 1895. Chinese residents in Taiwan were given the option of selling their property and leaving by May 1897, or become Japanese citizens. From 1895 to 1897, an estimated 6,400 people, mostly gentry elites, sold their property and left Taiwan. The vast majority did not have the means or will to leave.

Upon Tainan's surrender, Kabayama declared Taiwan pacified, however his proclamation was premature. Armed resistance by Hakka villagers broke out in the south. A series of prolonged partisan attacks, led by "local bandits" or "rebels", lasted throughout the next seven years. After 1897, uprisings by Chinese nationalists were commonplace. , a member of the Tongmenghui organization preceding the Kuomintang, was arrested and executed along with two hundred of his comrades in 1913. Japanese reprisals were often more brutal than the guerilla attacks staged by the rebels. In June 1896, 6,000 Taiwanese were slaughtered in the Yunlin Massacre. From 1898 to 1902, some 12,000 "bandit-rebels" were killed in addition to the 6,000-14,000 killed in the initial resistance war of 1895. During the conflict, 5,300 Japanese were killed or wounded, and 27,000 were hospitalized.

Rebellions were often caused by a combination of unequal colonial policies on local elites and extant millenarian beliefs of the local Taiwanese and plains Aborigines. Ideologies of resistance drew on different ideals such as Taishō democracy, Chinese nationalism, and nascent Taiwanese self-determination. Support for resistance was partly class-based and many of the wealthy Han people in Taiwan preferred the order of colonial rule to the lawlessness of insurrection.

Major armed resistance was largely crushed by 1902 but minor rebellions started occurring again in 1907, such as the Beipu uprising by Hakka and Saisiyat people in 1907, Luo Fuxing in 1913 and the Tapani Incident of 1915. The Beipu uprising occurred on 14 November 1907 when a group of Hakka insurgents killed 57 Japanese officers and members of their family. In the following reprisal, 100 Hakka men and boys were killed in the village of Neidaping. Luo Fuxing was an overseas Taiwanese Hakka involved with the Tongmenghui. He planned to organize a rebellion against the Japanese with 500 fighters, resulting in the execution of more than 1,000 Taiwanese by Japanese police. Luo was killed on 3 March 1914. In 1915, Yu Qingfang organized a religious group that openly challenged Japanese authority. In what is known as the Tapani incident, 1,413 members of Yu's religious group were captured. Yu and 200 of his followers were executed. After the Tapani rebels were defeated, Andō Teibi ordered Tainan's Second Garrison to retaliate through massacre. Military police in Tapani and Jiasian announced that they would pardon any anti-Japanese militants and that those who had fled into the mountains should return to their village. Once they returned, the villagers were told to line up in a field, dig holes, and were then executed by firearm. According to oral tradition, at least 5,000-6,000 people died in this incident.

Non-violent resistance

Nonviolent means of resistance such as the Taiwanese Cultural Association (TCA), founded by Chiang Wei-shui in 1921, continued to exist after most violent means were exhausted. Chiang was born in Yilan in 1891 and was raised on a Confucian education paid by a father who identified as a Han Chinese. In 1905, Chiang started attending Japanese elementary school. At the age of 20, he was admitted to Taiwan Sotokufu Medical School and in his first year of college, Chiang joined the Taiwan Branch of the "Chinese United Alliance" founded by Sun Yat-sen. The TCA's anthem, composed by Chiang, promoted friendship between China and Japan, Han and Japanese, and peace between Asians and white people. He saw Taiwanese people as Japanese nationals of Han Chinese ethnicity and wished to position the TCA as an intermediary between China and Japan. The TCA also aimed to "adopt a stance of national self-determination, enacting the enlightenment of the Islanders, and seeking legal extension of civil rights." He told the Japanese authorities that the TCA was not a political movement and would not engage in politics.

Statements aspiring to self determination and Taiwan belonging to the Taiwanese were possible at the time due to the relatively progressive era of Taishō Democracy. At the time most Taiwanese intellectuals did not wish for Taiwan to be an extension of Japan. "Taiwan is Taiwan people's Taiwan" became a common position for all anti-Japanese groups for the next decade. In December 1920, Lin Hsien-tang and 178 Taiwanese residents filed a petition to Tokyo seeking self-determination. It was rejected.

The TCA had over 1,000 members composed of intellectuals, landlords, public school graduates, medical practitioners, and the gentry class. TCA branches were established across Taiwan except in indigenous areas. They gave cultural lecture tours and taught Classical Chinese as well as other more modern subjects. The TCA sought to promote vernacular Chinese language. Cultural Lecture Tours were treated as a festivity, using firecrackers traditionally used to ward off evil as a challenge against Japanese authority. If any criticism of Japan was heard, the police immediately ordered the speaker to step down.  In 1923 the TCA co-founded Taiwan People's News which was published in Tokyo and then shipped to Taiwan. It was subjected to severe censorship by Japanese authorities. As many as seven or eight issues were banned. Chiang and others applied to set up an "Alliance to Urge for a Taiwan Parliament." It was deemed legal in Tokyo but illegal in Taiwan. In 1923, 99 Alliance members were arrested and 18 were tried in court. Chiang was forced to defend against the charge of "asserting 'Taiwan has 3.6 million Zhonghua Minzu/Han People' in petition leaflets." Thirteen were convicted: 6 fined, 7 imprisoned (including Chiang). Chiang was imprisoned more than ten times.

The TCA split in 1927 to form the New TCA and the Taiwanese People's Party. The TCA had been influenced by communist ideals resulting in Chiang and Lin's departure to form the Taiwan People's Party (TPP). The New TCA later became a subsidiary of the Taiwanese Communist Party, founded in Shanghai in 1928, and the only organization advocating for Taiwan's independence. The TPP's flag was designed by Chiang and drew on the Republic of China's flag for inspiration. The TPP brought forth issues in Taiwan such as Japanese opium trafficking, the inhumane treatment of the Seediq people, and revealed the colonial authority's use of poisonous gas. In February 1931, the TPP was terminated. Chiang died from typhoid on 23 August.

Assimilation movement
In 1914, Itagaki Taisuke briefly led a Taiwan assimilation movement as a response to appeals from influential Taiwanese spokesmen such as the Wufeng Lin family and Lin Hsien-t'ang and his cousin. Wealthy Taiwanese made donations to the movement. In December 1914, Itagaki formally inaugurated the Taiwan Dōkakai, an assimilation society. Within a week, over 3,000 Taiwanese and 45 Japanese residents joined the society. After Itagaki left later that month, leaders of the society were arrested and its Taiwanese members detained or harassed. In January 1915, the Taiwan Dōkakai was disbanded.

Japanese colonial policy sought to strictly segregate the Japanese and Taiwanese population until 1922. Taiwanese students who moved to Japan for their studies were able to associate more freely with Japanese and took to Japanese ways more readily than their island counterparts. However full assimilation was rare. Even acculturated Taiwanese seem to have become more aware of their distinctiveness and island background while living in Japan.

An attempt to fully Japanize the Taiwanese people was made during the kōminka period (1937–45). The reasoning was that only as fully assimilated subjects could Taiwan's inhabitants fully commit to Japan's war and national aspirations. The kōminka movement was generally unsuccessful and few Taiwanese became "true Japanese" due to the short time period and large population. In terms of acculturation under controlled circumstances, it can be considered relatively effective.

Education

A system of elementary common schools (kōgakkō) was introduced. These elementary schools taught Japanese language and culture, Classical Chinese, Confucian ethnics, and practical subjects like science. Classical Chinese was included as part of the effort to win over Taiwanese upper-class parents, but the emphasis was on Japanese language and ethics. These government schools served a small percentage of the Taiwanese school-age population while Japanese children attended their own separate primary schools (shōgakkō). Few Taiwanese attended secondary school or were able to enter medical college. Due to limited access to government educational institutions, a segment of the population continued to enroll in private schools similar to the Qing era. Most boys attended Chinese schools (shobo) while a smaller portion of males and females received training at religious schools (Dominican and Presbyterian). Universal education was deemed undesirable during the early years since the assimilation of Han Taiwanese seemed unlikely. Elementary education offered both moral and scientific education to those Taiwanese who could afford it. The hope was that through selective education of the brightest Taiwanese, a new generation of Taiwanese leaders responsive to reform and modernization would emerge.

Many of the gentry class had mixed feelings about modernization and cultural change, especially the kind advanced by government education. The gentry was urged to promote the "new learning", a fusion of Neo-Confucianism and Meiji-style education, however those invested in the Chinese education style seemed resentful of the proposed merging. A younger generation of Taiwanese more susceptible to modernization and change started participating in community affairs in the 1910s. Many were concerned about obtaining modern educational facilities and the discrimination they faced in obtaining spots at the few government schools. Local leaders in Taichung began campaigning for the inauguration of the Taichū Middle School but faced opposition from Japanese officials reluctant to authorize a middle school for Taiwanese males.

In 1922, an integrated school system was introduced in which common and primary schools were opened to both Taiwanese and Japanese based on their background in spoken Japanese. Elementary education was divided between primary schools for Japanese speakers and public schools for Taiwanese speakers. Since few Taiwanese children could speak fluent Japanese, in practice only the children of very wealthy Taiwanese families with close ties to Japanese settlers were allowed study alongside Japanese children. The number of Taiwanese at formerly Japanese-only elementary schools was limited to 10 percent. Japanese children also attended kindergarten, during which they were segregated from Taiwanese children. In one instance a Japanese-speaking child was put in the Taiwanese group with the expectation that they would learn Japanese from her, but the experiment failed and the Japanese-speaking child learned Taiwanese instead. The competitive situation in Taiwan made some Taiwanese seek secondary education and opportunities in Japan and Manchukuo rather than Taiwan. In 1943, primary education became compulsory, and by the next year nearly three out of four children were enrolled in primary school. Taiwanese also studied in Japan. By 1922 at least 2,000 Taiwanese were enrolled in educational institutions in metropolitan Japan. The number increased to 7,000 by 1942.

Japanization

As Japan embarked on full-scale war with China in 1937, it implemented the "kōminka" imperial Japanization project to instill the "Japanese Spirit" in Taiwanese residents, and ensure the Taiwanese would remain imperial subjects subjects (kōmin) of the Japanese Emperor rather than support a Chinese victory. The goal was to make sure the Taiwanese people did not develop a sense of "their national identity, pride, culture, language, religion, and customs". Although the stated goal was to assimilate the Taiwanese, in practice the Kōminka hōkōkai organization that formed segregated the Japanese into their own separate block units, despite co-opting Taiwanese leaders. The organization was responsible for increasing war propaganda, donation drives, and regimenting Taiwanese life during the war.

As part of the kōminka policies, Chinese language sections in newspapers and Classical Chinese in the school curriculum were removed in April 1937. China and Taiwan's history were also erased from the educational curriculum. Chinese language use was discouraged, which reportedly increased the percentage of Japanese speakers among the Taiwanese, but the effectiveness of this policy is uncertain. Even some members of model "national language" families from well-educated Taiwanese households failed to learn Japanese to a conversational level. A name-changing campaign was launched in 1940 to replace Chinese names with Japanese ones. Seven percent of the Taiwanese had done so by the end of the war. Characteristics of Taiwanese culture considered "un-Japanese" or undesirable were to be replaced with Japanese ones. Taiwanese opera, puppet plays, fireworks, and burning gold and silver paper foil at temples were banned. Chinese clothing, betel-nut chewing, and noisiness were discouraged in public. The Taiwanese were encouraged to pray at Shinto shrines and expected to have domestic altars to worship paper amulets sent from Japan. Some officials were ordered to remove religious idols and artifacts from native places of worship.

Aboriginal policies

Status
The Japanese administration followed the Qing classification of aborigines into acculturated, (shufan), semi-acculturated (huafan), and non-acculturated aborigines (shengfan). Acculturated aborigines were treated the same as Chinese people and lost their aboriginal status. Han Chinese and shufan were both treated as natives of Taiwan by the Japanese. Below them were the semi-acculturated and non-acculturated "barbarians" who lived outside normal administrative units and upon whom government laws did not apply. According to the Sōtokufu (Office of the Governor-General), although the mountain aborigines were technically humans in biological and social terms, they were animals under international law.

The Musha Incident of 1930 which resulted in the death of 900 aborigines caused the government to take a more conciliatory stance towards the aborigines, and during World War 2, the government tried to assimilate them as loyal subjects.

Land rights
The Sōtokufu claimed all unreclaimed and forest land in Taiwan as government property. New use of forest land was forbidden. In October 1895, the government declared that these areas belonged to the government unless claimants could provide hard documentation or evidence of ownership. No investigation into the validity of titles or survey of land were conducted until 1911. The Japanese authority denied the rights of aborigines to their property, land, and anything on the land. Although the Japanese government did not control aboriginal land directly prior to military occupation, the Han and acculturated aborigines were forbidden from any contractual relationships with aborigines. The aborigines were living on government land but did not submit to government authority, and as they did not have political organization, they could not enjoy property ownership. The acculturated aborigines also lost their rent holder rights under the new property laws although they were able to sell them. Some reportedly welcomed the sale of rent rights because they had difficulty collecting rent.

In practice, the early years of Japanese rule were spent fighting mostly Chinese insurgents and the government took on a more conciliatory approach to the aborigines. Starting in 1903, the government implemented stricter and more coercive policies. It expanded the guard lines, previously the settler-aboriginal boundary, to restrict the aborigines' living space. By 1904 the guard lines had increased by 80 km from the end of Qing rule. Sakuma Samata launched a five-year plan for aboriginal management, which saw attacks against the aborigines and landmines and electrified fences used to force them into submission. Electrified fences were no longer necessary by 1924 due to the overwhelming government advantage.

After subjugating the mountain aborigines, a small portion of land was set aside for aboriginal use. From 1919 to 1934, aborigines were relocated to areas that would not impede forest development. At first they were given a small compensation for land use but this was discontinued later on and the aborigines were forced to relinquish all claims to their land. In 1928, it was decided that each aborigine would be allotted three hectares of reserve land. Some of the allotted land was taken for forest enterprises while it was discovered that the aboriginal population was bigger than the estimated 80,000. The size of the allotted land was reduced but they were not adhered to anyways. In 1930, the government relocated aborigines to the foothills and invested in agricultural infrastructure to turn them into subsistence farmers. They were given less than half the originally promised land, amounting to one-eighth of their ancestral lands.

Aboriginal resistance
Aboriginal resistance to the heavy-handed Japanese policies of acculturation and pacification lasted up until the early 1930s. By 1903, indigenous rebellions had resulted in the deaths of 1,900 Japanese in 1,132 incidents. In 1911 a large military force invaded Taiwan's mountainous areas to gain access to timber resources. By 1915, many aboriginal villages had been destroyed. The Atayal and Bunun resisted the hardest against colonization. The last major aboriginal rebellion, the Musha (Wushe) Uprising occurred on 27 October 1930 when the Seediq people, angry over their treatment while laboring in camphor extraction, launched the last headhunting party. Groups of Seediq warriors led by Mona Rudao attacked policed stations and the Musha Public School. Approximately 350 students, 134 Japanese, and 2 Han Chinese dressed in Japanese garbs were killed in the attack. The uprising was crushed by 2,000–3,000 Japanese troops and aboriginal auxiliaries with the help of poison gas. The armed conflict ended in December when the Seediq leaders committed suicide. According to Japanese colonial records, 564 Seediq warriors surrendered and 644 were killed or committed suicide. According to a 1933-year book, wounded people in the war against the aboriginals numbered around 4,160, with 4,422 civilians dead and 2,660 military personnel killed.

Japanese colonists
Japanese commoners started arriving in Taiwan in April 1896. Japanese migrants were encouraged to move to Taiwan because it was considered the most effective way of integrating Taiwan into the Japanese Empire. Few Japanese moved to Taiwan during the colony's early years due to poor infrastructure, instability, and fear of disease. Later on as more Japanese settled in Taiwan, some settlers came to view the island as their homeland rather than Japan. There was concern that Japanese children born in Taiwan, under its tropical climate, would not be able to understand Japan. In the 1910s, primary schools conducted trips to Japan to nurture their Japanese identity and to prevent Taiwanization. Out of necessity, Japanese police officers were encouraged to learn the local variants of Minnan and the Guangdong dialect of Hakka. There were language examinations for police officers to receive allowances and promotions. By the late 1930s, Japanese people made up about 5.4 percent of Taiwan's total population but owned 20-25 percent of the cultivated land which was also of higher quality. They also owned the majority of large land holdings. The Japanese government assisted them in acquiring land and coerced Chinese land owners to sell to Japanese enterprises. Japanese sugar companies owned 8.2 percent of the arable land.

At the end of the Second World War, there were almost 350,000 Japanese civilians living in Taiwan. They were designated as Overseas Japanese (Nikkyō) or as Overseas Ryukyuans (Ryūkyō). Offspring of intermarriage were considered Japanese if their Taiwanese mother chose Japanese citizenship or if their Taiwanese father did not apply for ROC citizenship. As many as half the Japanese who left Taiwan after 1945 were born in Taiwan. The Taiwanese did not engage in widespread acts of revenge or push for their immediate removal, although they quickly seized or attempted to occupy property they believed were unfairly obtained in previous decades. Japanese assets were collected and the Nationalist government retained most of the properties for government use, to the consternation of the Taiwanese. Theft and acts of violence did occur, however this has been attributed to the pressure of wartime policies. Chen Yi, who was in charge of Taiwan, removed Japanese bureaucrats and police officers from their posts, resulting in unaccustomed economic hardship for Japanese citizens. Their hardship in Taiwan was also met by news of hardship in Japan. A survey found that 180,000 Japanese civilians wished to leave for Japan while 140,000 wished to stay. An order for the deportation of Japanese civilians was issued in January 1946. From February to May, the vast majority of Japanese left Taiwan and arrived in Japan without much trouble. Overseas Ryukyuans were ordered to assist the deportation process by building camps and work as porters for the Overseas Japanese. Each person was allowed to leave with two pieces of luggage and 1,000 yen. The Japanese and Ryukyuans remaining in Taiwan by the end of April did so at the behest of the government. Their children attended Japanese schools to prepare for life in Japan.

Industrialization

Under the Japanese colonial government, Taiwan was introduced to a unified system of weights and measures, a centralized bank, education facilities to increase skilled labor, farmers' associations, and other institutions. An island wide system of transportation and communications as well as facilities for travel between Japan and Taiwan were developed. Construction of large scale irrigation facilities and power plants followed. Agricultural development was the primary emphasis of Japanese colonization in Taiwan. The objective was for Taiwan to provide Japan with food and raw materials. Fertilizer and production facilities were imported from Japan. Industrial farming, electric power, chemical industries, aluminum, steel, machinery, and shipbuilding facilities were set up. Textile and paper industries were developed near the end of Japanese rule for self-sufficiency. All modern and large enterprises were owned by the Japanese.

The Bank of Taiwan was established in 1899 to encourage Japanese private sectors, including Mitsubishi and the Mitsui Group, to invest in Taiwan. In 1900, the third Governor-General of Taiwan passed a budget which initiated the building of Taiwan's railroad system from Kīrun (Keelung) to Takao (Kaohsiung). By 1905 the island had electric power supplied by water power in Nichigetsu Lake (Sun Moon Lake), and in subsequent years Taiwan was considered the second-most developed region of East Asia (after Japan). By 1905, Taiwan was financially self-sufficient and had been weaned off of subsidies from Japan's central government.

Under the governor Shimpei Goto's rule, many major public works projects were completed. The Taiwan rail system connecting the south and the north and the modernizations of Kīrun and Takao ports were completed to facilitate transport and shipping of raw material and agricultural products. Exports increased by fourfold. Fifty-five percent of agricultural land was covered by dam-supported irrigation systems. Food production had increased fourfold and sugar cane production had increased 15-fold between 1895 and 1925 and Taiwan became a major foodbasket serving Japan's industrial economy. A health care system was widely established and infectious diseases were almost completely eradicated. The average lifespan for a Taiwanese resident would become 60 years by 1945.

After 1939, the war in China and eventually other places started having a deleterious effect on Taiwan's agricultural output as military conflict took up all of Japan's resources. Taiwanese real GDP per capita peaked in 1942 at $1,522 and declined to $693 by 1944. War-time bombing of Taiwan caused significant damage to many cities and harbors in Taiwan. The railways, plants, and other production facilities were either badly damaged or destroyed. Only 40 percent of the railroads were usable and over 200 factories were bombed, most of them housing Taiwan's vital industries. Of Taiwan's four electrical power plants, three were destroyed. Loss of major industrial facilities is estimated at $506 million, or 42 percent of fixed manufacturing assets. Damage to agriculture was relatively contained in comparison but most developments came to a halt and irrigation facilities were abandoned. Since all key positions were held by Japanese, their departure resulted in the loss of 20,000 technicians and 10,000 professional workers, leaving Taiwan with a severe lack of trained personnel. Inflation was rampant as a result of the war and worsened later due to economic integration with China because China was also experiencing high inflation. Taiwanese industrial output recovered to 38 percent of its 1937 level by 1947 and recovery to pre-war standards of living did not occur until the 1960s.

World War II

As Japan embarked on full-scale war with China in 1937, it expanded Taiwan's industrial capacity to manufacture war material. By 1939, industrial production had exceeded agricultural production in Taiwan. The Imperial Japanese Navy operated heavily out of Taiwan. The "South Strike Group" was based out of the Taihoku Imperial University (now National Taiwan University) in Taiwan. Taiwan was used as a launchpad for the invasion of Guangdong in late 1938 and for the occupation of Hainan in February 1939. A joint planning and logistical center was established in Taiwan to assist Japan's southward advance after the bombing of Pearl Harbor on 7 December 1941. Taiwan served as a base for Japanese naval and air attacks on the island Luzon until the surrender of the Philippines in May 1942. It also served as a rear staging ground for further attacks on Myanmar. As the war turned against Japan in 1943, Taiwan suffered due to Allied submarine attacks on Japanese shipping, and the Japanese administration prepared to be cut off from Japan. In the latter part of 1944, Taiwan's industries, ports, and military facilities were bombed in U.S. air raids. An estimated 16,000-30,000 civilians died from the bombing. By 1945, Taiwan was isolated from Japan and its government prepared to defend against an expected invasion.

Military service

Starting in July 1937, Taiwanese began to play a role on the battlefield, initially as civilian interpreters, transporters, laborers, and other noncombatant positions. Taiwanese people were not recruited for combat until late in the war due to Japanese suspicions of Taiwanese loyalty. In 1942, the Special Volunteer System was implemented, allowing even aborigines to be recruited as part of the Takasago Volunteer Army. The Imperial Navy Special Volunteer System was implemented in July 1943 and military conscription in 1945. From 1937 to 1945, over 207,000 Taiwanese were employed by the Japanese military: 126,000 civilian employees and 80,000 servicemen. Among them, 33,000 were sent to mainland China and 61,000 to the Philippines. Roughly 50,000 went missing in action or died as war casualties, another 2,000 were disabled, 21 were executed for war crimes, and 147 were sentenced to imprisonment for two or three years. Survivors faced difficulties in both mainland China and Taiwan after the war.

Some Taiwanese ex-Japanese soldiers claim they were coerced and did not choose to join the army. Wang Qinghuai was a farmer at the time of the war and said there was no way to refuse recruitment. Others, such as Xie Yong, were in vocational school at the time and their Japanese military instructor told them that the "nation and emperor needed us." They went through a short period of training and became military aviation machinists. Lin Xinglin was recruited into the army while living in Japan but was given a civilian position later once they found out he was not Japanese. Some were incentivized by the attractive salary, which was double what they could earn in Taiwan. Some joined out of patriotism to Japan and felt that working in the military was an honor. One Liu Chengqing who enrolled in 1944 as a civilian employee said in an August 1995 interview that he felt empowered by the "Yamato Spirit."

Most Taiwanese experienced a short service period due to their late recruitment in the war. Many were assigned to civilian positions rather than combat positions. Racial discrimination from Japanese soldiers towards the Taiwanese was commonplace but there were also rare occasions of camaraderie. Lu Qinglin joined the Japanese Navy in May 1945 but was demoted to a civilian employee once they found out he was Taiwanese. He then became a clerk because Taiwanese could not work in a lab. However Lu befriended a Major Suzuki who treated him like a foster son. Some faced moments of greater equality during their time in the military. Chen Chunqing stated that "Facing the bullets of the enemy, you and the Japanese are equal." He was motivated by his desire to fight the British and Americans but was sent to China after a month of training. There he became disillusioned and tried to leave to join other Taiwanese who had defected to the Chinese side, although his effort was fruitless. Chen Genfa was called "chankoro" (Qing slave) by a Japanese soldier, who was then beat up by Japanese MPs once Chen said he was ready to die for the nation and emperor. Some of the Taiwanese ex-Japanese soldiers had ambivalent feelings upon Japan's defeat and could not imagine what liberation from Japan and what Taiwan's return to China would look like. One Zhou Yichun recalled surrender leaflets dropped by U.S. planes stating that Taiwan would return to China and Korea was going to be independent. He said, "I had striven hard to be a loyal subject of the emperor, and today I discovered something that I remembered my grandfather telling me—that I was a Chinese."

After Japan's surrender, the Taiwanese ex-Japanese soldiers were abandoned by Japan and left to their own devices. No transportation back to Taiwan or Japan was provided. Many of them met with difficulties in mainland China, Taiwan, and Japan. In mainland China they faced anti-rightist campaigns which accused them of being part of the colonial forces. In Taiwan they experienced similar circumstances as well as accusations of taking part in the February 28 incident. In Japan they were faced with ambivalence. An organization of Taiwanese ex-Japanese soldiers tried to get the Japanese government to pay their unpaid wages several decades later. They failed.

Comfort women

Between 1,000 and 2,000 Taiwanese women were part of the comfort women system. Aboriginal women served Japanese military personnel in the mountainous region of Taiwan. They were first recruited as housecleaning and laundry workers for soldiers, then they were coerced into providing sex. They were gang-raped and served as comfort women in the evening hours. Han Taiwanese women from low income families were also part of the comfort women system. Some were pressured into it by financial reasons while others were sold by their families. However some women from well to do families also ended up as comfort women. More than half of the young women were minors with some as young as 14. Very few women who were sent overseas understood what the true purpose of their journey was. Some of the women believed they would be serving as nurses in the Japanese military prior to becoming comfort women. Taiwanese women were told to provide sexual services to the Japanese military "in the name of patriotism to the country." By 1940, brothels were set up in Taiwan to service Japanese males.

End of Japanese rule

In 1942, after the United States entered the war against Japan and on the side of China, the Chinese government under the KMT renounced all treaties signed with Japan before that date and made Taiwan's return to China (as with Manchuria, ruled as the Japanese wartime puppet state of "Manchukuo") one of the wartime objectives. In the Cairo Declaration of 1943, the Allied Powers declared the return of Taiwan (including the Pescadores) to the Republic of China as one of several Allied demands. The Cairo Declaration was never signed or ratified and is not legally binding. In 1945, Japan unconditionally surrendered with the signing of the instrument of surrender and ended its rule in Taiwan as the territory was put under the administrative control of the Republic of China government in 1945 by the United Nations Relief and Rehabilitation Administration. The Office of the Supreme Commander for the Allied Powers ordered Japanese forces in China and Taiwan to surrender to Chiang Kai-shek. On 25 October 1945, Governor-General Rikichi Andō handed over the administration of Taiwan and the Penghu islands to the head of the Taiwan Investigation Commission, Chen Yi. On 26 October, the government of the Republic of China declared that Taiwan had become a province of China. The Allied Powers, on the other hand, did not recognize the unilateral declaration of annexation of Taiwan made by the government of the Republic of China.

Legality
In accordance with the provisions of Article 2 of San Francisco Peace Treaty, the Japanese formally renounced the territorial sovereignty of Taiwan and Penghu islands, and the treaty was signed in 1951 and came into force in 1952. At the date when the San Francisco Peace Treaty came into force, the political status of Taiwan and Penghu Islands was still uncertain. The Republic of China and Japan signed the Treaty of Taipei on April 28, 1952, and the treaty came into force on August 5, which is considered by some as giving a legal support to the Republic of China's claim to Taiwan as "de jure" territory. The treaty stipulates that all treaties, conventions, and agreements between China and Japan prior to 9 December 1941 were null and void, which according to Hungdah Chiu, abolishes the Treaty of Shimonoseki ceding Taiwan to Japan. The interpretation of Taiwan becoming the Republic of China's '"de jure" territory is supported by several Japanese court decisions such as the 1956 Japan v. Lai Chin Jung case, which stated that Taiwan and the Penghu islands came to belong to the ROC on the date the Treaty of Taipei came into force. Nevertheless, the official position of the Government of Japan is that Japan did not in the Treaty of Taipei express that Taiwan and Penghu belong to the Republic of China, that the Treaty of Taipei could not make any disposition which is in violation of Japan's renouncing Taiwan and Penghu in San Francisco Peace Treaty, and that the status of Taiwan and Penghu remain to be determined by the Allied Powers in the future.

Writing in the American Journal of International Law, professors Jonathan I. Charney and J. R. V. Prescott argued that "none of the post–World War II peace treaties explicitly ceded sovereignty over the covered territories to any specific state or government." The Cairo Conference from November 22–26, 1943 in Cairo, Egypt was held to address the Allied position against Japan during World War II, and to make decisions about postwar Asia. One of the three main clauses of the Cairo Declaration was that "all the territories Japan has stolen from the Chinese, such as Manchuria, Formosa, and The Pescadores, shall be restored to the Republic of China". According to Taiwan Civil Society quoting the Taiwan Documents Project, the document was merely a statement of intent or non-binding declaration, for possible reference used for those who would draft the post-war peace treaty and that as a press release it was without force of law to transfer sovereignty from Taiwan to the Republic of China. Additional rationale to support this claim is that the Act of Surrender, and SCAP General Order no. 1, authorized the surrender of Japanese forces, not Japanese territories.

In 1952, Winston Churchill said that Taiwan was not under Chinese sovereignty and the Chinese Nationalists did not represent the Chinese state, but that Taiwan was entrusted to the Chinese Nationalists as a military occupation. Churchill called the Cairo Declaration outdated in 1955. The legality of the Cairo Declaration was not recognized by the deputy prime minister of the United Kingdom, Anthony Eden, in 1955, who said there was a difference of opinion on which Chinese authority to hand it over to. In 1954, the United States denied that the sovereignty of Taiwan and the Penghu islands had been settled by any treaties, although it acknowledged that the Republic of China effectively controlled Taiwan and Penghu. In the 1960 Sheng v. Rogers case, it was stated that, in the view of the U.S. State Department, no agreement has purported to transfer the sovereignty of Taiwan to the ROC, though it accepted the exercise of Chinese authority over Taiwan and recognized the Government of the Republic of China as the legal government of China at the time.

According to Vincent Wei-Cheng Wang, a minority of scholars and politicians have argued that the international status of Taiwan is still undecided, and that this has been used as an argument against the People's Republic of China's claim over Taiwan. They point to President Truman's statement on the pending status of Taiwan in 1950, the lack of specificity on whom the title of Taiwan was transferred to in the 1951 San Francisco peace treaty, and the absence of explicit provisions on the return of Taiwan to China in the 1952 Treaty of Taipei. However Wang notes that this is a weak argument, citing 2 LASSA OPPENHEIMER, INTERNATIONAL LAW, under the principle of effective occupation and control, if nothing is stipulated on conquered territory in the peace treaty, the possessor may annex it. Still, the notion that a possessor may annex a conquered territory despite the peace treaty not stipulating so, was a means of territorial transfer recognized by classical international law, and its legality in recent years is either not recognized or disputed. According to Jian-De Shen, applying such a notion on the Republic of China's territorial claim for Taiwan is invalid because the conqueror of World War II is the whole body of the Allied Powers rather than the Republic of China alone. The Theory of the Undetermined Status of Taiwan is supported by some politicians and jurists to this day, such as the Government of the United States and the Japanese diplomatic circle.

Republic of China (1945–)

Taiwan under martial law

The Republic of China established the Taiwan Provincial Government in September 1945 and proclaimed on October 25, 1945, as "Taiwan Retrocession Day." This is the day in which the Japanese troops surrendered. By 1938 about 309,000 Japanese lived in Taiwan. Between the Japanese surrender of Taiwan in 1945 and April 25, 1946, the Republic of China forces repatriated 90% of the Japanese living in Taiwan to Japan. During the immediate postwar period, the Kuomintang (KMT) administration on Taiwan was repressive and extremely corrupt compared with the previous Japanese rule, leading to local discontent. Anti-mainlander violence flared on 28 February 1947, prompted by an incident in which a cigarette seller was injured and a passerby was indiscriminately shot dead by Nationalist authorities. During the ensuing crackdown by the KMT administration in what became known as the February 28 Incident, tens of thousands of people were killed or arrested, and the incident became a taboo topic of discussion for the entire martial law era.  The Memorial Foundation of 228 was established to provide compensation for the victims of the crackdown.  From 1995 To 2006, the foundation approved compensation in 2,264 cases, including 680 cases wherein the victim died in the massacre, 179 case wherein the victim was unaccounted for, and 1,405 other cases (including victims who suffered from imprisonment, injuries or damage to reputation).

From the 1930s onward the Chinese Civil War was underway in mainland China between Chiang Kai-shek's ROC government and the Chinese Communist Party led by Mao Zedong. When the Communists gained complete control of Mainland China in 1949, two million refugees, predominantly from the Nationalist government, military, and business community, fled to Taiwan. On October 1, 1949, the People's Republic of China (P.R.C.) was founded in mainland China by the victorious communists; several months before, Chiang Kai-shek had established a provisional ROC capital in Taipei and moved his Nanjing-based government there after fleeing Chengdu. Under Nationalist rule, the mainlanders dominated the government and civil services.

Following their retreat to Taiwan the KMT viewed their retreat as a temporary one with Chiang Kai-shek saying "prepare for one year, counterattack in two years, sweep out the enemy in three years and succeed within five years." This led them to prioritize military armament and preparation over economic development.

Economic development

In the immediate aftermath of World War II, post-war economic conditions compounded with the then-ongoing Chinese Civil War caused severe inflation across mainland China and in Taiwan, made worse by disastrous currency reforms and corruption. This gave way to the reconstruction process and new reforms.

The KMT took control of Taiwan's monopolies that had been owned by the Japanese prior to World War II. They nationalized approximately 17% of Taiwan's GNP and voided Japanese bond certificates held by Taiwanese investors. These real estate holdings as well as American aid such as the China Aid Act and the Sino-American Joint Commission on Rural Reconstruction helped to ensure that Taiwan would recover quickly from war. The Kuomintang government also moved the entire gold reserve from the Chinese mainland to Taiwan, and used this reserve to back the newly issued New Taiwan dollar to stabilize the new currency and put a stop to hyperinflation.

The KMT authorities implemented a far-reaching and highly successful land reform program on Taiwan during the 1950s. The 375 Rent Reduction Act alleviated tax burden on peasants and another act redistributed land among small farmers and compensated large landowners with commodities certificates and stock in state-owned industries. Although this left some large landowners impoverished, others turned their compensation into capital and started commercial and industrial enterprises. These entrepreneurs were to become Taiwan's first industrial capitalists. Together with businessmen who fled from mainland China, they once again revived Taiwan's prosperity previously ceased along with Japanese withdrawal and managed Taiwan's transition from an agricultural to a commercial, industrial economy.

From 1950 to 1965, Taiwan received a total of $1.5 billion in economic aid and $2.4 billion in military aid from the United States. In 1965 all American aid ceased when Taiwan had established a solid financial base. Having accomplished that, ROC president Chiang Ching-kuo (the son of Chiang Kai-shek) started state projects such as the Ten Major Construction Projects that provided the infrastructure for building a strong export-driven economy. Taiwan has developed steadily into a major international trading power with more than $218 billion in two-way trade and one of the highest foreign exchange reserves in the world. Tremendous prosperity on the island was accompanied by economic and social stability. Taiwan's phenomenal economic development earned it a spot as one of the Four Asian Tigers.

Democratic reforms 

Chiang Kai-shek died in April 1975, and was succeeded to the presidency by Yen Chia-kan while his son Chiang Ching-kuo succeeded to the leadership of the Kuomintang (opting to take the title "Chairman" rather than the elder Chiang's title of "Director-General"). Formerly the head of the feared secret police, Chiang Ching-kuo recognized gaining foreign support to securing the ROC's future security required reform. His administration saw a gradual loosening of political controls, a transition towards democracy, and moves toward Taiwanization of the regime. Opponents of the Nationalists were no longer forbidden to hold meetings or publish papers. Though opposition political parties were still illegal, when the Democratic Progressive Party was established as the first opposition party in 1986, President Chiang decided against dissolving the group or persecuting its leaders. Its candidates officially ran in elections as independents in the Tangwai movement. In the following year, Chiang ended martial law and allowed family visits to mainland China. Chiang selected Lee Teng-hui, a Taiwan born technocrat to be his vice president; the first in the line of succession to the presidency. The move followed other reforms giving more power to native born citizens and calmed anti-KMT sentiments.

After Chiang Ching-kuo died in 1988, his successor, President Lee Teng-hui, continued to democratize the government. Lee transferred more government authority to Taiwanese born citizens, and Taiwan underwent a process of Taiwanization. In this localization process, local culture and history was promoted over a pan-China viewpoint. Lee's reforms included printing banknotes from the Central Bank instead of the usual Provincial Bank of Taiwan. He also largely suspended the operation of the Taiwan Provincial Government. In 1991 the Legislative Yuan and National Assembly elected in 1947 were forced to resign. These groups were originally created to represent mainland China constituencies. The restrictions on the use of Taiwanese languages in the broadcast media and in schools were also lifted.

However, Lee failed to crack down on the massive corruption that pervaded the government and many KMT loyalists felt that Lee betrayed the ROC by taking reforms too far, while those in the opposition felt he did not take reforms far enough.

Democratic period

The 2000 presidential election marked the end of the Kuomintang (KMT) rule. DPP candidate Chen Shui-bian won a three-way race that saw the Pan-Blue vote split by independent James Soong (formerly of the Kuomintang) and Kuomintang candidate Lien Chan. Chen garnered 39% of the vote.

In 2004, President Chen was re-elected to a second four-year term after an assassination attempt which occurred the day before the election. Two shots were fired, with one bullet grazing the President's belly after penetrating the windshield of a jeep and several layers of clothing and the other bullet penetrated the windshield and hitting the vice president's knee cast. (She was wearing a knee cast due to an earlier injury.) Police investigators have said that the most likely suspect is believed to have been Chen Yi-hsiung, who was later found dead.

The president faced similar accusations as his wife, but was protected from prosecution by presidential immunity. He had promised to resign if his wife was found guilty. However, after his wife fainted in the preparation hearing, she had sought and obtained absence of leave from the Court 16 times citing health concerns before President Chen Shui-bian's term was complete.

In 2007, President Chen proposed a policy of Four Wants and One Without, which in substance states that Taiwan wants independence; Taiwan wants the rectification of its name; Taiwan wants a new constitution; Taiwan wants development; and Taiwanese politics is without the question of left or right, but only the question of unification or independence. The reception of this proposed policy in Taiwanese general public was unclear. It, however, was met with a cold reception by both the PRC and the United States. The PRC Foreign Minister emphasised that the Anti-Secession Law was not a piece of unenforceable legislation, while the US Department of State spokesman Sean McCormack described Chen's policy as "unhelpful".

The KMT also retained control of the legislature in the Legislative Yuan elections in January 2008. In the presidential election in May 2008, KMT candidate Ma Ying-jeou ran on a platform supporting friendlier relations with mainland China and economic reforms, and defeated DPP candidate Frank Hsieh with 58.48% of the vote.

On the same day President Chen left office, losing presidential immunity, the Supreme Prosecutor's Office announced that they were launching an inquiry into corruption charges regarding Chen. Later in 2008, members of his administration, including Chiou I-jen, a former National Security Council secretary-general, and Yeh Sheng-mao, former director-general of the Ministry of Justice's Investigation Bureau, were arrested on corruption charges. Chiou I-jen was found not guilty, while Yeh Sheng-mao was convicted and sentenced to 10 years in prison.

Ma was re-elected, and the KMT retained its majority in the Legislative Yuan, in combined elections in January 2012.

In March and April 2014, students protesting against undemocratic methods used by the KMT occupied the parliament building. In the end, the government agreed to put on hold the ratification of an agreement with China which they had pushed through without proper debate. This event had far reaching consequences, and changed the mood of the electorate. In the combined elections in January 2016 the opposition candidate for president, Tsai Ing-wen, of the DPP won with 56% of the vote, and the opposition DPP was catapulted into an outright majority in the parliament. The election marked the first time a non-KMT party won a majority in the legislature.

The local elections held on November 24, 2018, resulted in a major setback for the DPP majority and led to President Tsai Ing-wen resignation as leader of the party. The DPP lost a total of nine legislative seats, giving the KMT control of the majority of the 22 seats. KMT mayoral candidates won in New Taipei City, Taichung and Kaohsiung, the latter of which has been a political stronghold for the DPP for 20 years.

In May 2019, Taiwan became the first country in Asia to legalise same-sex marriage.

In January, 2020, Tsai Ing-wen was re-elected in the presidential election. In the parliamentary election President Tsai's Democratic Progressive Party (DPP) won majority 61 out of 113 seats. The Kuomintang (KMT) won 38 seats.

The 2022 visit by Nancy Pelosi to Taiwan resulted in increased tensions between Taiwan and China while reinforcing US-Taiwan ties. In response to the trip the PLA conducted military exercises around Taiwan, included missile launches which overflew Taiwan.

See also 
 Geography of Taiwan
 Timeline of Taiwanese history
 Economic history of Taiwan
 Taiwanese indigenous peoples
 Han Taiwanese
 Foreign relations of Taiwan
 History of Asia, East Asia, China, & Japan
 Japanese expansionism & Taiwanese opium policy
 Dutch Empire
 Knowing Taiwan
 Military dependents' village
 Politics of the Republic of China
 Political status of Taiwan
 Taiwan independence movement & Chinese unification

Notes

References

Citations

Cited sources 

 
 
 
 
 

 
 
 

 

 
 
 

 

 
 

 
 

 
 
 

 

 

 
 . Reprinted 1995, SMC Publishing, Taipei.

General references

 
 

 
 
 
 

 

 
 

 
 

 
 
 
 
 
 
 
 Reuters, "Taiwan election shooting suspect dead," (2005)|reference=Reuters. "Taiwan election shooting suspect dead," 7 March 2005.
 
 
  Accessed 3/16/2007.

Historiography and memory 
 
 
 Ts' ai, Hui-yu Caroline. "Diaries and Everyday Life in Colonial Taiwan." Japan Review (2013): 145–168. online

External links

 Taiwan's 400 years of history, from "Taiwan, Ilha Formosa" (a pro-independence organization)
 Reed Institute's Formosa Digital Library
 History of Taiwan  from FAPA (a pro-independence organization)
 Taiwan History China Taiwan Information Center (PRC perspective)
 Museum Fort San Domingo Exhibition in Tamsui about the Dutch history of Taiwan
 Taiwan Memory-Digital Photo Museum Taiwan old photos digital museum plan 
 America and Taiwan, 1943–2004
 Time Mapping Taiwan – YouTube